= Participatory planning =

Decentralized, whole community-based urban design process

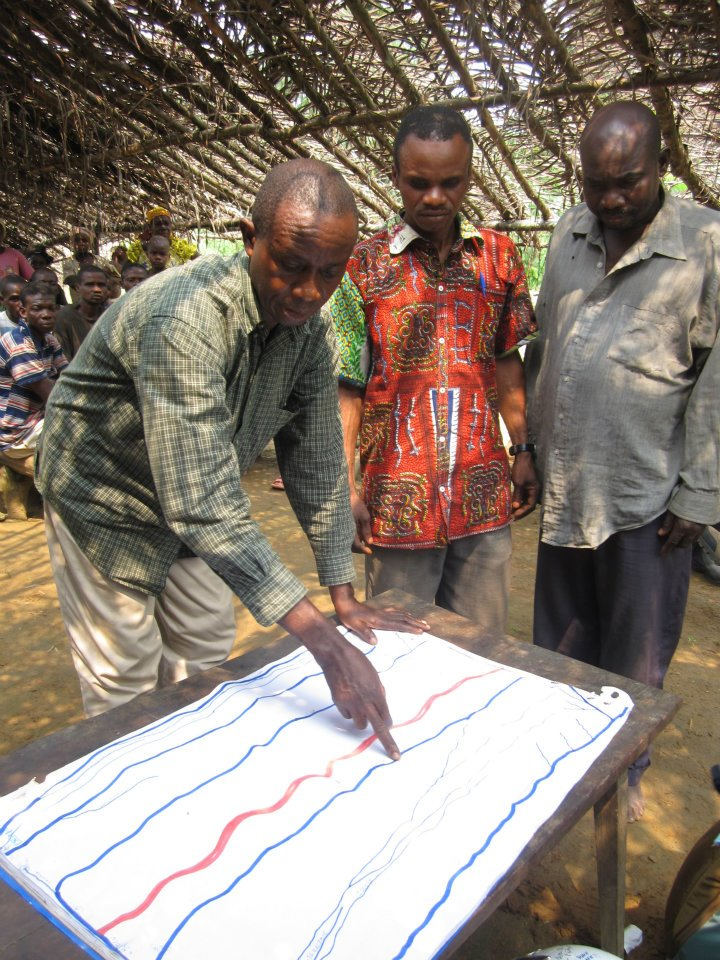
A community engaged in a participatory planning project

Participatory planning is an urban planning paradigm that seeks to involve the community of an area in the urban planning of that area. Its goal is to allow communities to work together to identify and address problems and to create a plan to achieve a desired social and economical goal. Participatory planning emerged in response to the centralized and rationalistic approaches that defined early urban planning work.

The importance of participatory planning is that it ensures the planning process reflects the interests and priorities of all major groups in the community. It also helps to build commitment to translating the plan into action. It has become an influential way of approaching traditional urban planning and international community development.

There are several approaches to and theories about participatory planning. Consensus building and collective decision making is usually emphasized, and the inclusion of traditionally marginalized groups in the planning process is also often prioritized.

== Origins ==
=== Rational planning tradition ===
Prior to the 1970s, community planning was generally led in a top-down way by professionals. Modern community planning developed in the late 19th and early 20th centuries as city governments and urban planners began to create centralized, comprehensive community plans such as the garden cities of Ebenezer Howard. In this era, the rational planning model was the dominant way of approaching urban planning. Professional planners would identify an established set of goals for a project, rationally weigh a set of alternatives to achieve those goals, and then create and implement a plan accordingly.

There was very little room for public participation within these rationalistic planning models. While discussing the common threads in the vision and work of early urban planners, urbanist Peter Hall writes that "Their vision seems to have been that of the planner as the omniscient ruler, who should create new settlement forms ... without interference or question. The complexities of planning in a participatory democracy where individuals and groups have their own, often contradictory, notions of what should happen—all of these are absent from the work of these pioneers."

A rationalist approach to planning was often applied during the urban renewal programs of the mid-20th century. Under these programs, large areas in major cities, often where poorer people and people of color lived, were demolished, and a new plan for the area was designed and carried out. These urban renewal programs have been criticized for destroying viable communities with long histories, and displacing disproportionately black and poor people to other underserved parts of the city.

=== Emergence of participatory planning ===
In the 1960s and 70s, there was a growing wave of critical responses to these traditional rationalist approaches. Scholars criticized traditional planning methods as undemocratic and unresponsive to community needs. In her influential 1961 book The Death and Life of Great American Cities, Jane Jacobs argued that centralized planning methods are disconnected from real knowledge of life in a city. In 1969, Sherry Arnstein wrote a landmark essay, A Ladder of Citizen Participation, describing different types of citizen involvement in municipal programs, and criticizing less participatory approaches to urban planning. In the 1970s a series of planning theorists suggested alternative models of urban planning which were more participatory in nature. Prominent among them were John Friedmann's model of transactive planning, Paul Davidoff and Linda Davidoff's model of advocacy planning, and Stephen Grabow and Allen Heskin's theory of radical planning. These models constituted a shift towards a more participatory planning paradigm which has influenced modern urban planning.

At around the same time, participation became increasingly central to planning policy and practice. In 1961, landscape architect Karl Linn started the first community design center in Philadelphia. Community design centers are organizations which provide planning expertise to marginalized communities. These grassroots participatory planning models became widespread, often organizing to fight major urban renewal projects. In the mid-1960s, the federal government responded to widespread criticisms of urban renewal by establishing the Model Cities Program and the Community Action Program. These two programs were part of Lyndon B. Johnson's Great Society, and included a focus on community participation. The legislation establishing both programs required the "maximum feasible participation of the members of groups and areas to be served". These programs were influential and marked an important turn towards a more participatory vision of urban planning.

In recent years, participatory planning has continued to evolve, leveraging digital technologies to enhance community engagement. The integration of tools such as Geographic Information Systems (GIS), virtual reality, and online platforms has made it easier for citizens to visualize planning proposals and provide feedback. This digital shift has been particularly evident in projects like participatory budgeting initiatives in cities like Paris and New York, where technology facilitates broader and more inclusive participation. Additionally, contemporary urban planning increasingly focuses on sustainability and resilience, integrating participatory approaches to address climate change and disaster risk reduction.

== Methods ==
Participatory planning programs use a range of methods and tools to facilitate public participation in the urban planning process. Since the 1960s, planning programs have used tools such as referendums, focus groups, consensus conferences, citizen advisory committees, public hearings, and public opinion surveys to encourage public participation. Some planning practitioners employ more comprehensive approaches to participatory planning, such as Participatory rural appraisal. Social media and other digital tools have transformed participatory urban planning. Many organizations have integrated these participatory planning methods into their work, either conducting broad community planning projects or conducting planning initiatives for specific purposes such as forest management, natural disaster risk reduction, and ancient rock art management.

=== Participatory rural appraisal ===
Participatory Rural Appraisal is a method of participatory planning, used most often in the context of international community development. Participatory Rural Appraisal draws heavily on the work of Paulo Freire and his idea of critical consciousness, as well as Kurt Lewin's integration of democratic leadership, group dynamics, experiential learning, action research, and open systems theory. PRA has been modified and reframed in the related models of Participatory Learning and Action (PLA), and Community-Based Participatory Research (CBPR). Robert Chambers, an important early practitioner of Participatory Rural Appraisal outlines a "menu" of specific methods and techniques that are central to the broad technique of Participatory Rural Appraisal, including:

- Semi-structured interviews
- Participatory mapping and modelling
- Time lines and trend and change analysis
- Transect walks
- Daily time-use analysis
- Institutional diagramming
- Matrix scoring and ranking
- Shared presentations and analysis
- Oral histories and ethno-biographies

=== Participatory e-planning ===
Participatory Planning organizations can use digital tools to enhance and organize public participation in the planning process. E-participation has come into use in public service programs as information and communications technologies have become more available. E-planning draws on the tools and techniques of e-participation in the context of urban planning. It has been described as "a socio-cultural, ethical and political practice which takes place offline and online in the overlapping phases of the planning and decision-making cycle, by using digital and non-digital tools". Participatory e-planning research has generally focused on incorporating forms of participation with existing governance and urban planning processes. Some participatory e-planning programs involve the use of relatively simple digital tools like online questionnaires, surveys, and polls to consult citizens. Other programs have used information and communications technologies that were designed for everyday use — such as mainstream social media — to seek out more widespread and open-ended public input. Often, the public engages with planners through social media outlets even if their input is not directly solicited, indicating that e-planning has the potential to foster organic bottom-up participatory planning. Other participatory planning processes have used existing digital technologies like virtual reality, and interactive games to increase participation. Some digital tools have been designed specifically to encourage public participation in urban planning.

==== Participatory geographic information systems ====
Participatory Geographic Information Systems (GIS) are an increasingly widespread tool for participatory e-planning. Traditional GIS are computerized tools that organize a wide variety of geographically referenced information. This information is generally displayed on a computerized map. Since the 1990s there have been attempts to develop Participatory GIS systems. These systems are diverse, applied in a wide range of contexts, and have incorporated different ways of asking for public participation, such as Participatory 3D Modelling. Often, participatory planning practitioners will create a detailed interactive map of a community using a GIS program, and then ask for public input using the interactive map as a tool. Several planning programs have combined Participatory GIS Software with large interactive touchscreens, so a large group of stakeholders can stand around an interactive map and manipulate it to give their input. GIS technology has also been integrated with other kinds of Information and Communications Technology such as Decision Support Systems, to create interfaces to bring about public participation.

== Theory ==
A range of scholars, theorists, and urban planners have suggested different theoretical models to emphasize citizen participation in the planning process.

=== Non-hierarchical planning ===
In 1965, Christopher Alexander published an influential essay, A City is Not a Tree, later expanded upon in a book of the same name. In the essay he argued against mainstream planning practices which represented cities with overly simplified hierarchical models. In those models, small systems or areas in cities were thought of as subdivisions of larger systems and areas, which were in turn thought of as subdivisions of larger systems and areas, in a model that resembled a tree. Alexander argued that these models are easy to understand, but do not reflect the reality of cities, in which different systems and communities interact in complex and overlapping ways. Alexander proposed that urban planners should think of the city instead in a non-hierarchical "semi-lattice" structure. Alexander stresses that these new models require planners to incorporate much more complicated understandings of the city, and it is difficult for planners to understand all of the complicated interactions and structures that are incorporated in this semi-lattice view.

Other scholars drew on this to argue for more participatory, non-hierarchical approaches to planning. Scholars argued that non-hierarchical models of the city were too complex to be understood or designed through a centralized process, and so must rely on the input and perspectives of a wide range of people. This non-hierarchical understanding of how cities function laid the groundwork for the participatory planning paradigm.

=== Arnstein's ladder of citizen participation ===
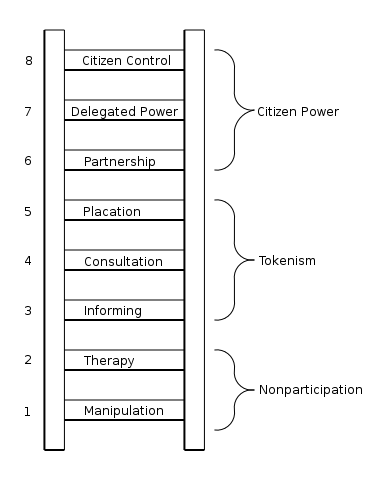
Shelly Arnstein's Ladder of Citizen Participation

Responding to the persistent gap between the desires of local communities, and traditional rationalistic approaches to planning, Sherry Arnstein wrote her essay A Ladder of Citizen Participation in 1969 to "encourage a more enlightened dialogue". The ladder identifies different levels of citizen participation in government programs.

Arnstein describes eight different forms of participation, arranged in three categories: non-participation, degrees of tokenism, and degrees of citizen power. She advocates that government projects and planning processes should involve the forms of citizen participation that she places higher on the ladder. Her critical assault has become influential on current theory and practice of citizen participation in urban planning and government programs, and is an important piece of the participatory planning paradigm. Participatory planning programs incorporate many different levels and forms of participation, but they generally draw on Arnstein's critique of programs that have no role for citizen input, or only incorporate tokenistic participation.

=== Participatory planning models ===
Within the participatory planning paradigm, there are several theoretical models of what participatory planning should look like. The kind of participation that these models call for varies, but they all emphasize participation as a central piece of a well-designed approach to planning. The following are several of the most influential participatory planning models.

==== Advocacy planning ====
Paul Davidoff and Linda Davidoff, in their essay Advocacy and Pluralism in Planning, proposed a participatory approach to planning called Advocacy Planning, in which planners would work directly with different groups of people in the city, including underrepresented communities and interest groups, to design plans which corresponded to those groups' specific needs. Planners would then argue on behalf of these plans in front of a central planning commission.

==== Transactive planning ====
John Friedmann proposed a transactive model of planning in his 1973 book Retracking America: A Theory of Transactive Planning. Transactive planning suggests that urban planners should engage in face-to-face conversation with members of the community who have immediate, experiential knowledge of their neighborhood. In transactive planning, this dialog is paired with collaborative action, in which planners and community members all engage in the design process. This model emphasizes learning and development of the people and institutions involved, rather than more specific programmatic goals.

==== Radical planning ====
Stephen Grabow and Allan Heskin advocated for radical planning in their 1973 essay Foundations for a Radical Concept of Planning. Radical planning calls for sweeping structural changes in the planning field. Heskin and Grabow argued that planning decisions should be broadly decentralized and connected more closely to small communities that they affected most directly, and that planners should not be thought of as separate from the communities they serve. Heskin and Grabow wrote that under radical planning "the 'planner' is one of us, or all of us."

==== Communicative planning ====
A group of planning theorists in the 1980s and 1990s, including Patsy Healey and Judith Innes, developed a participatory model of planning which they refer to as communicative planning. Communicative planning draws heavily on Jürgen Habermas's idea of communicative rationality, and proposes an approach to planning in which different stakeholders in the planning process participate in reflective conversations, work to resolve conflicts in their values and priorities, and collectively create a consensus plan. In this process, planners work to support this deliberation and offer technical expertise when called for.

== Examples ==
=== World Bank ===
The community-driven development approach advocated by the World Bank is an example of participatory planning.

A number of examples link participatory community plans with local government planning. One widely applied example is South Africa's national policy of community-based planning methodology, and an adapted version, the Harmonised Participatory Planning Guide for Lower Level Local Governments, which is national policy in Uganda. Community-Based Planning has been applied across the whole of eThekwini Metropolitan Municipality in South Africa, including the City of Durban, and is being rolled out in Ekurhuleni Metropolitan Municipality.

=== Britain in the 1940s ===
After the bombing of British cities during World War II, planning advocates wanted to use the reconstruction planning as a way to engage the public. The planners wanted more authority in the political system to play a more substantive role within their democracy. The planners created new techniques to, "communicate with laypeople, including mobilizing publicity, measuring public opinion, organizing exhibitions, and experimenting with new visual strategies." They also developed a forum to educate and ask the public about various plans and policies.

=== Cincinnati's Over-the-Rhine neighborhood ===
Cincinnati's Over-The-Rhine's Comprehensive Plan was created in a participatory planning process, but its consistent monitoring of its implementation failed. Looking at Cincinnati's Over-the-Rhine neighborhood, geographers saw ways to obtain "necessary data, create a land-use GIS to analyze the data, update the data, and monitor the progress of the implementation of the Over-the Rhine Comprehensive Plan". In the case of Cincinnati, it is proven that plans that are not carried out fail to live up to the participatory planning theory. Failures like that of the Over-the-Rhine plan make it harder to make progress toward the plan's goal as well as silencing participants.

=== Managing forests ===
Forest management involves a variety of stakeholders, including the owners of the forest, locals, tourism enterprises, recreational uses, private or official conservationists, or the forest industry. Each of these parties has a different goal in using forests, which complicates planning. Participatory approaches and computerized tools like decision support systems (DSS) have been used to help balance these diverse priorities. The features of DSS that can help participatory processes in the context of forest management. are the following: "group decision support, possibilities to include other values than timber productions of planning, flexibility of system to include non-traditional forest data and management options, and multi-criteria decision analysis tools."

Recent examples include community-based urban development projects, such as the participatory budgeting initiatives in cities like Paris and New York, Moscow, Shanghai, Beijing, New Delhi and Mexico City and environmental projects like the co-design of green infrastructure in European cities.

== Criticism ==
Participatory planning has been discussed as contributing to the housing crisis by slowing the speed of new development projects.

== See also ==
- Community development
- Free association of producers
- Participatory budgeting
- Participatory design
- Participatory development
- Participatory economics
- Participatory justice
- Public participation
- Public participation (decision making)

== Bibliography ==
- Goldman, Ian and Abbott, Joanne, eds. (April 2004) "Decentralisation and community-based planning. " Participatory Learning and Action Notes 49. International Institute for Environment and Development:London.
