= Theories of urban planning =

Body of knowledge of urban planning

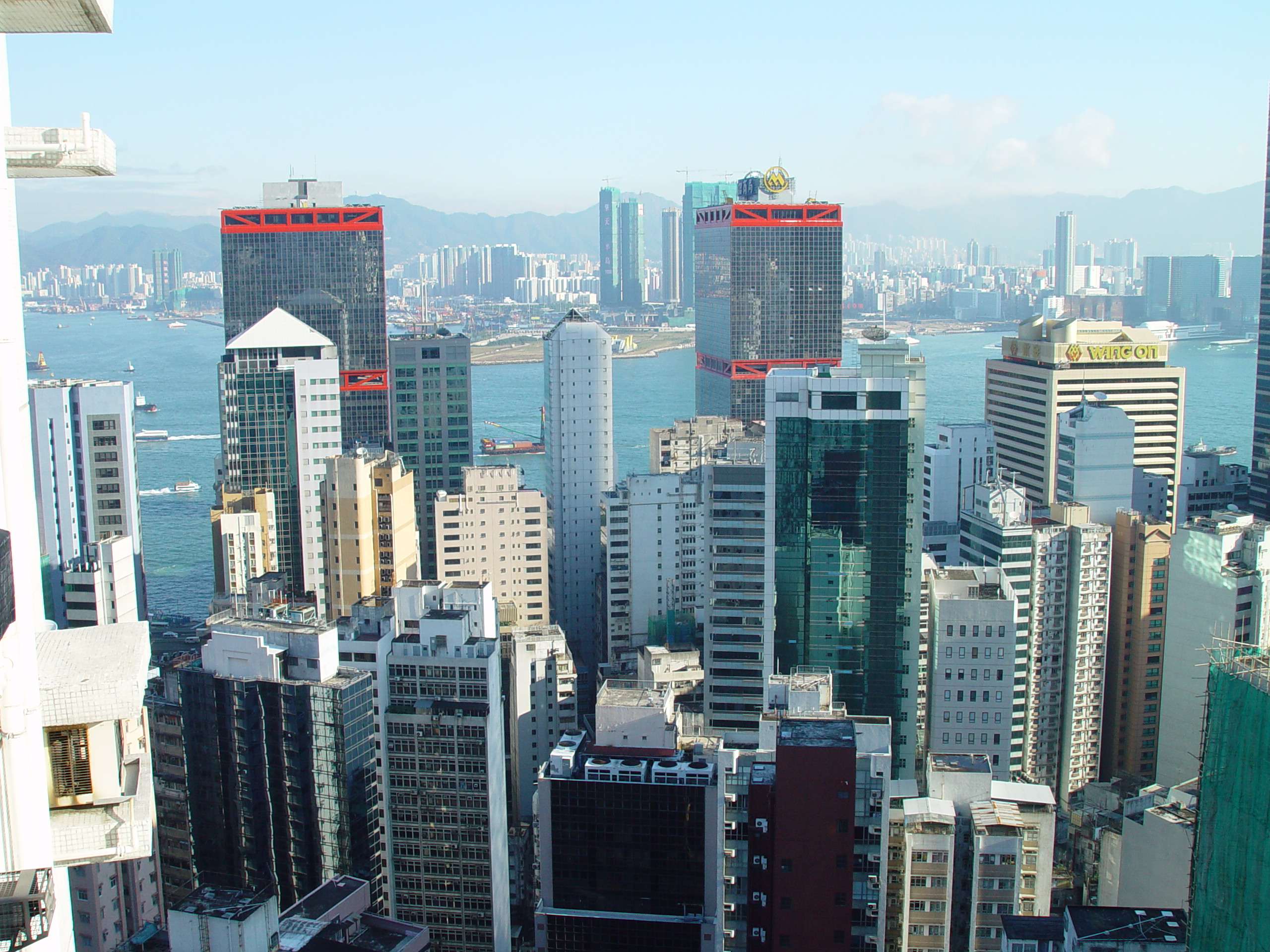
Urban planning designs settlements, from the smallest towns to the largest cities. Shown here is Hong Kong from Western District overlooking Kowloon, across Victoria Harbour.

Planning theory is the body of scientific concepts, definitions, behavioral relationships, and assumptions that define the body of knowledge of urban planning. Urban planning is the strategic process of designing and managing the growth and development of human settlements, from small towns to sprawling metropolitan areas. Various planning theories guide urban development decisions and policies. Over time, different schools of thought have emerged, Evolving in response to shifts in society, economy, and technology. This article explores the key theories and movements that have shaped urban planning. There is no one unified planning theory but various.

Whittemore identifies nine procedural theories that dominated the field between 1959 and 1983: the Rational-Comprehensive approach, the Incremental approach, the Transformative Incremental (TI) approach, the Transactive approach, the Communicative approach, the Advocacy approach, the Equity approach, the Radical approach, and the Humanist or Phenomenological approach.

== Background ==
Urban planning can include urban renewal, by adapting urban planning methods to existing cities suffering from decline. Alternatively, it can concern the massive challenges associated with urban growth, particularly in the Global South. All in all, urban planning exists in various forms and addresses many different issues. The modern origins of urban planning lie in the movement for urban reform that arose as a reaction against the disorder of the industrial city in the mid-19th century. The new imagined urban form was meant to go hand-in-hand with a new society, based upon voluntary co-operation within self-governing communities.

In the late 20th century, the term sustainable development has come to represent an ideal outcome in the sum of all planning goals. Sustainable architecture involves renewable materials and energy sources and is increasing in importance as an environmentally friendly solution.

== Blueprint planning ==
Since at least the Renaissance and the Age of Enlightenment, urban planning had generally been assumed to be the physical planning and design of human communities. Therefore, it was seen as related to architecture and civil engineering, and thereby to be carried out by such experts. This kind of planning was physicalist and design-orientated, and involved the production of masterplans and blueprints which would show precisely what the 'end-state' of land use should be, similar to architectural and engineering plans. Similarly, the theory of urban planning was mainly interested in visionary planning and design which would demonstrate how the ideal city should be organised spatially.

=== Sanitary movement ===
Although it can be seen as an extension of the sort of civic pragmatism seen in Oglethorpe's plan for Savannah or William Penn's plan for Philadelphia, the roots of the rational planning movement lie in Britain's Sanitary movement (1800–1890). During this period, advocates such as Charles Booth argued for central organized, top-down solutions to the problems of industrializing cities. In keeping with the rising power of industry, the source of the planning authority in The Sanitary Movement arose as a direct response to the appalling living conditions in rapidly industrializing cities, focusing on improving public health through the creation of better sanitation infrastructure, including sewage systems and clean water supplies.

=== Garden city movement ===
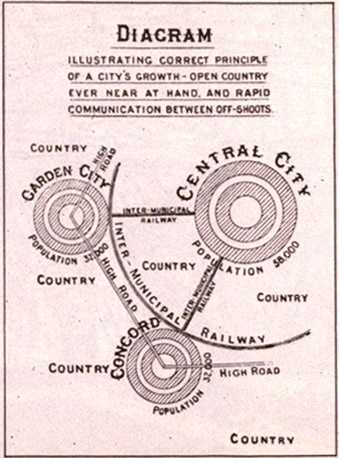
A diagram of Howard's planned Social City.

The Garden city movement was founded by Ebenezer Howard (1850-1928). The Garden City Movement advocated for the development of self-sufficient, planned communities that combined the best aspects of both urban and rural living. These communities would be surrounded by green belts to provide residents with access to nature while maintaining proximity to urban amenities. His ideas were expressed in the book Garden Cities of To-morrow (1898). His influences included Benjamin Walter Richardson, who had published a pamphlet in 1876 calling for low population density, good housing, wide roads, an underground railway and for open space; Thomas Spence who had supported common ownership of land and the sharing of the rents it would produce; Edward Gibbon Wakefield who had pioneered the idea of colonizing planned communities to house the poor in Adelaide (including starting new cities separated by green belts at a certain point); James Silk Buckingham who had designed a model town with a central place, radial avenues and industry in the periphery; as well as Alfred Marshall, Peter Kropotkin and the back-to-the-land movement, which had all called for the moving of masses to the countryside.

Howard aimed to merge urban convenience with rural tranquility to promote healthier communities called Town-Country. To make this happen, a group of individuals would establish a limited-dividend company to buy cheap agricultural land, which would then be developed with investment from manufacturers and housing for the workers. No more than 32,000 people would be housed in a settlement, spread over 1,000 acres. Around it would be a permanent green belt of 5,000 acres, with farms and institutions (such as mental institutions) which would benefit from the location. After reaching the limit, a new settlement would be started, connected by an inter-city rail, with the polycentric settlements together forming the "Social City". The lands of the settlements would be jointly owned by the inhabitants, who would use rents received from it to pay off the mortgage necessary to buy the land and then invest the rest in the community through social security. Actual garden cities were built by Howard in Letchworth, Brentham Garden Suburb, and Welwyn Garden City. The movement would also inspire the later New towns movement.

=== Linear city ===
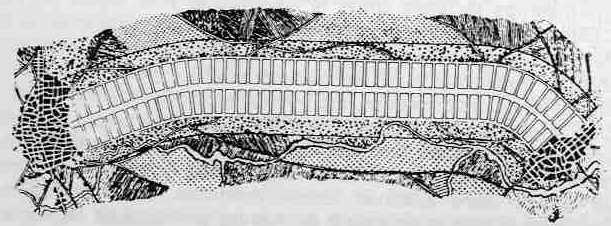
Arturo Soria's blueprint concept of the Linear city.

Arturo Soria y Mata's idea of the Linear city (1882) replaced the traditional idea of the city as a centre and a periphery with the idea of constructing linear sections of infrastructure - roads, railways, gas, water, etc.- along an optimal line and then attaching the other components of the city along the length of this line. As compared to the concentric diagrams of Ebenezer Howard and other in the same period, Soria's linear city creates the infrastructure for a controlled process of expansion that joins one growing city to the next in a rational way, instead of letting them both sprawl. The linear city was meant to ‘ruralize the city and urbanize the countryside’, and to be universally applicable as a ring around existing cities, as a strip connecting two cities, or as an entirely new linear town across an unurbanized region. The idea was later taken up by Nikolay Alexandrovich Milyutin in the planning circles of the 1920s Soviet Union. The Ciudad Lineal was a practical application of the concept.

=== Regional planning movement ===
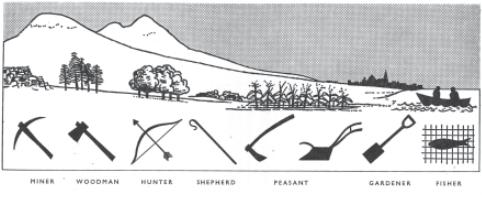
An archetypical example of a Valley Section.

Patrick Geddes (1864-1932) was the founder of regional planning. His main influences were the geographers Élisée Reclus and Paul Vidal de La Blache, as well as the sociologist Pierre Guillaume Frédéric le Play. From these he received the idea of the natural region. According to Geddes, planning must start by surveying such a region by crafting a "Valley Section" which shows the general slope from mountains to the sea that can be identified across scale and place in the world, with the natural environment and the cultural environments produced by it included. This was encapsulated in the motto "Survey before Plan". He saw cities as being changed by technology into more regional settlements, for which he coined the term conurbation. Similar to the garden city movement, he also believed in adding green areas to these urban regions. The Regional Planning Association of America advanced his ideas, coming up with the 'regional city' which would have a variety of urban communities across a green landscape of farms, parks and wilderness with the help of telecommunication and the automobile. This had major influence on the County of London Plan, 1944.

=== City Beautiful movement ===
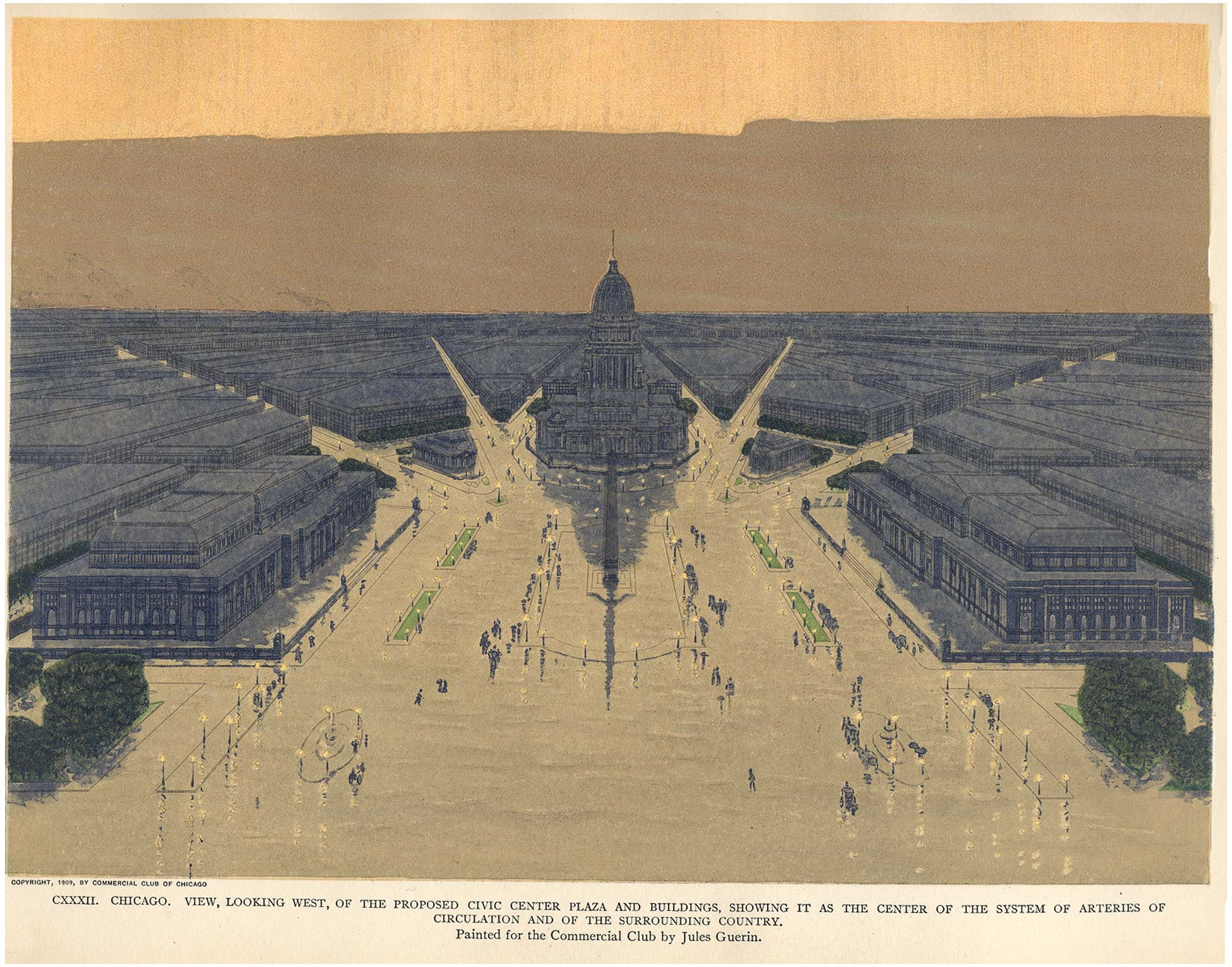
The Civic Centre Plaza planned (but never realized) in Burnham's plan for Chicago.

The City Beautiful movement was inspired by 19th century European capital cities such as Georges-Eugène Haussmann's Paris or the Vienna Ring Road. An influential figure was Daniel Burnham (1846-1912), who was the chief of construction of the World's Columbian Exposition in 1893. Urban problems such as the 1886 Haymarket affair in Chicago had created a perceived need to reform the morality of the city among some of the elites. Burnham's greatest achievement was the Chicago plan of 1909. His aim was "to restore to the city a lost visual and aesthetic harmony, thereby creating the physical prerequisite for the emergence of a harmonious social order", essentially creating social reform through new slum clearance and creating public space, which also endeared it the support of the Progressivist movement. This was also believed to be economically advantageous by drawing in tourists and wealthy migrants.

Because of this it has been referred to as "trickle-down urban development" and as "centrocentrist" for focusing only on the core of the city. Other major cities planned according to the movement principles included British colonial capitals in New Delhi, Harare, Lusaka, Nairobi and Kampala, as well as that of Canberra in Australia, and Albert Speer's plan for the Nazi capital Germania.

=== Towers in the park ===
Le Corbusier (1887–1965) pioneered a new urban form called towers in the park. His approach was based on defining the house as 'a machine to live in'. The Plan Voisin he devised for Paris, which was never fulfilled, would have involved the demolition of much of historic Paris in favour of 18 uniform 700-foot tower blocks. Ville Contemporaine and the Ville Radieuse formulated his basic principles, including decongestion of the city by increased density and open space by building taller on a smaller footprint. Wide avenues should also be built to the city centre by demolishing old structures, which was criticized for lack of environmental awareness. His generic ethos of planning was based on the rule of experts who would "work out their plans in total freedom from partisan pressures and special interests" and that "once their plans are formulated, they must be implemented without opposition". His influence on the Soviet Union helped inspire the 'urbanists' who wanted to build planned cities full of massive apartment blocks in Soviet countryside. The only city which he ever actually helped plan was Chandigarh in India. Brasília, planned by Oscar Niemeyer, also was heavily influenced by his thought. Both cities suffered from the issue of unplanned settlements growing outside them.

=== Decentralised planning ===
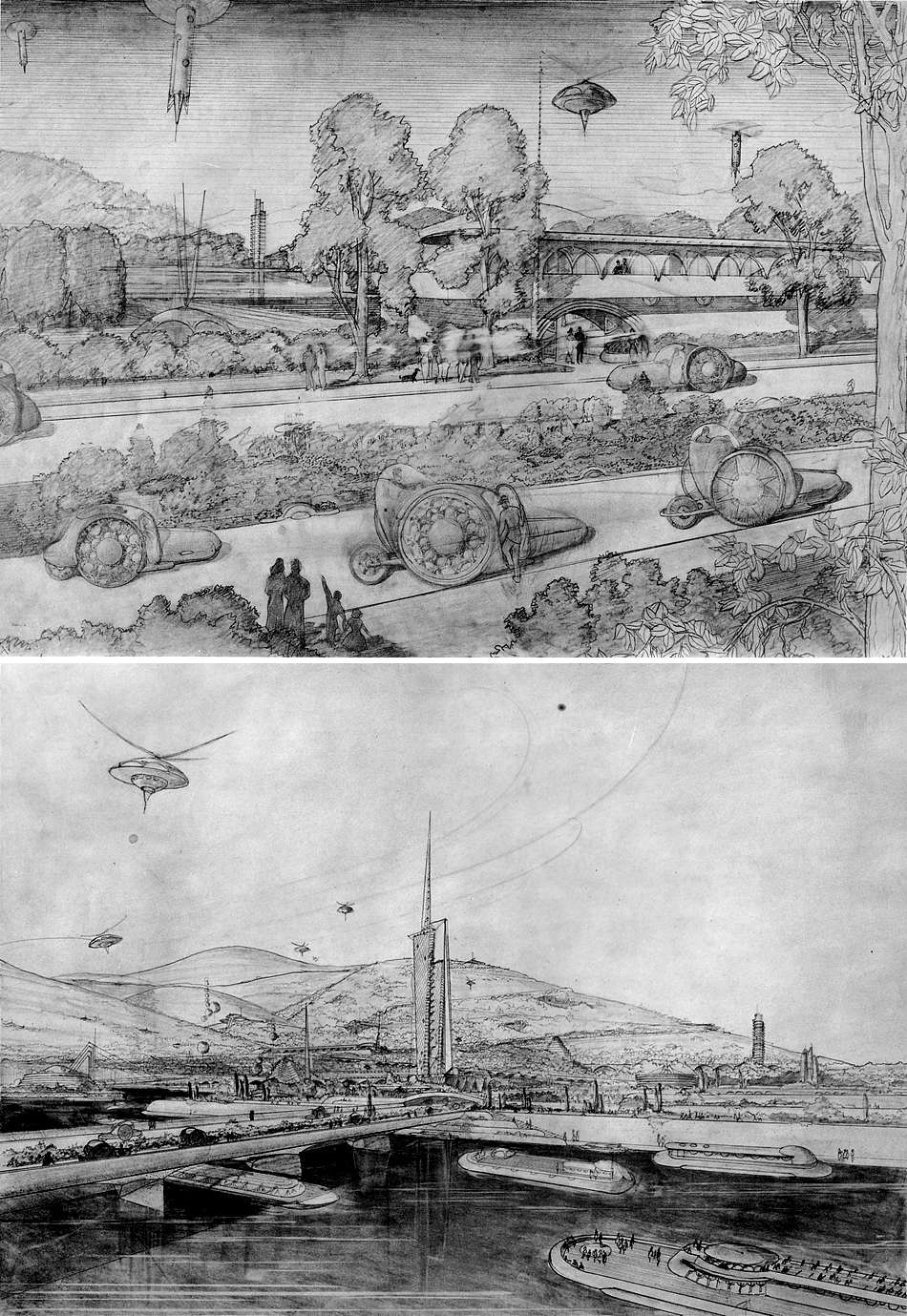
Wright's sketches of Broadacre City.

In the United States, Frank Lloyd Wright similarly identified vehicular mobility as a principal planning metric. Car-based suburbs had already been developed in the Country Club District in 1907-1908 (including later the world's first car-based shopping centre of Country Club Plaza), as well as in Beverly Hills in 1914 and Palos Verdes Estates in 1923. Wright began to idealise this vision in his Broadacre City starting in 1924, with similarities to the garden city and regional planning movements. The fundamental idea was for technology to liberate individuals. In his Usonian vision, he described the city as

"spacious, well-landscaped highways, grade crossings eliminated by a new kind of integrated by-passing or over- or under-passing all traffic in cultivated or living areas … Giant roads, themselves great architecture, pass public service stations . . . passing by farm units, roadside markets, garden schools, dwelling places, each on its acres of individually adorned and cultivated ground".

This was justified as a democratic ideal, as "“Democracy is the ideal of reintegrated decentralization … many free units developing strength as they learn by function and grow together in spacious mutual freedom.” This vision was however criticized by Herbert Muschamp as being contradictory in its call for individualism while relying on the master-architect to design it all.

After World War II, suburbs similar to Broadacre City spread throughout the US, but without the social or economic aspects of his ideas. A notable example was that of Levittown, built 1947 to 1951. The suburban design was criticized for their lack of form by Lewis Mumford as it lacked clear boundaries, and by Ian Nairn because "Each building is treated in isolation, nothing binds it to the next one".

In the Soviet Union too, the so-called deurbanists (such as Moisei Ginzburg and Mikhail Okhitovich) advocated for the use of electricity and new transportation technologies (especially the car) to disperse the population from the cities to the countryside, with the ultimate aim of a "townless, fully decentralized, and evenly populated country". However, in 1931 the Communist Party ruled such views as forbidden.

=== Opposition to blueprint planning ===
Throughout both the United States and Europe, the rational planning movement declined in the latter half of the 20th century. Key events in the United States include the demolition of the Pruitt-Igoe housing project in St. Louis and the national backlash against urban renewal projects, particularly urban expressway projects. An influential critic of such planning was Jane Jacobs, who wrote The Death and Life of Great American Cities in 1961, claimed to be "one of the most influential books in the short history of city planning". She attacked the garden city movement because its "prescription for saving the city was to do the city in" and because it "conceived of planning also as essentially paternalistic, if not authoritarian". The Corbusians on the other hand were claimed to be egoistic. In contrast, she defended the dense traditional inner-city neighborhoods like Brooklyn Heights or North Beach, San Francisco, and argued that an urban neighbourhood required about 200-300 people per acre, as well as a high net ground coverage at the expense of open space. She also advocated for a diversity of land uses and building types, with the aim of having a constant churn of people throughout the neighbourhood across the times of the day. This essentially meant defending urban environments as they were before modern planning had aimed to start changing them. As she believed that such environments were essentially self-organizing, her approach was effectively one of laissez-faire, and has been criticized for not being able to guarantee "the development of good neighbourhoods".

The most radical opposition to blueprint planning was declared in 1969 in a manifesto on the New Society, with the words that:

The whole concept of planning (the town-and-country kind at least) has gone cockeyed … Somehow, everything must be watched; nothing must be allowed simply to “happen.” No house can be allowed to be commonplace in the way that things just are commonplace: each project must be weighed, and planned, and approved, and only then built, and only after that discovered to be commonplace after all.

Another form of opposition came from the advocacy planning movement, opposes to traditional top-down and technical planning.

== Modernist planning ==
Cybernetics and modernism inspired the related theories of rational process and systems approaches to urban planning in the 1960s. They were imported into planning from other disciplines. The systems approach was a reaction to the issues associated with the traditional view of planning. It did not understand the social and economic sides of cities, the complexity and interconnectedness of urban life, as well as lacking in flexibility. The 'quantitative revolution' of the 1960s also created a drive for more scientific and precise thinking, while the rise of ecology made the approach more natural.

=== Systems theory ===
Systems theory is based on the conception of phenomena as 'systems', which are themselves coherent entities composed of interconnected and interdependent parts. A city can in this way be conceptualised as a system with interrelated parts of different land uses, connected by transport and other communications. The aim of urban planning thereby becomes that of planning and controlling the system. Similar ideas had been put forward by Geddes, who had seen cities and their regions as analogous to organisms, though they did not receive much attention while planning was dominated by architects.

The idea of the city as a system meant that it became critical for planners to understand how cities functioned. It also meant that a change to one part in a city would have effects on others parts as well. There were also doubts raised about the goal of producing detailed blueprints of how cities should look like in the end, instead suggesting the need for more flexible plans with trajectories instead of fixed futures. Planning should also be an ongoing process of monitoring and taking action in the city, rather than just producing the blueprint at one time. The systems approach also necessitated taking into account the economic and social aspects of cities, beyond just the aesthetic and physical ones.

=== Rational process approach ===
The focus on the procedural aspect of planning had already been pioneered by Geddes in his Survey-Analysis-Plan approach. However, this approach had several shortfalls. It did not consider the reasons for doing a survey in the first place. It also suggested that there should be simply a single plan to be considered. Finally, it did not take into account the implementation stage of the plan. There should also be further action in monitoring the outcomes of the plan after that. The rational process, in contrast, identified five different stages: (1) the definition of problems and aims; (2) the identification of alternatives; (3) the evaluation of alternatives; (4) implementation: (5) monitoring. This new approach represented a rejection of blueprint planning.

=== Incrementalism ===
Beginning in the late 1950s and early 1960s, critiques of the rational paradigm began to emerge and formed into several different schools of planning thought. The first of these schools is Lindblom's incrementalism. Lindblom describes planning as "muddling through" and thought that practical planning required decisions to be made incrementally. This incremental approach meant choosing from small number of policy approaches that can only have a small number consequences and are firmly bounded by reality, constantly adjusting the objectives of the planning process and using multiple analyses and evaluations.

=== Mixed scanning model ===
The mixed scanning model, developed by Etzioni, takes a similar approach to Lindblom. Etzioni (1968) suggested that organizations plan on two different levels: the tactical and the strategic. He posited that organizations could accomplish this by essentially scanning the environment on multiple levels and then choose different strategies and tactics to address what they found there. While Lindblom's approach only operated on the functional level Etzioni argued, the mixed scanning approach would allow planning organizations to work on both the functional and more big-picture oriented levels.

== Postmodern planning ==
Modernism sought to design and plan cities that followed the logic of the new model of industrial mass production; reverting to large-scale solutions, aesthetic standardization, and prefabricated design solutions. This approach was found to have eroded urban living by its failure to recognize differences and aim towards homogeneous landscapes. Jane Jacobs's 1961 book The Death and Life of Great American Cities, was a sustained critique of urban planning as it had developed within modernism, and played a major role in turning public opinion against modernist planners, notably Robert Moses.

Postmodern urban planning involves theories that embrace and aim to create diversity, elevating uncertainty, flexibility, and change, and rejecting utopianism while embracing a utopian way of thinking and acting. The postmodernity of "resistance" seeks to deconstruct modernism, a critique of the origins without necessarily returning to them. As a result, planners are much less inclined to lay a firm or steady claim to there being one single "right way" of engaging in urban planning and are more open to different styles and ideas of "how to plan".

This postmodern reaction is often compared with the modernist Chicago School, the then dominant movement founded at the University of Chicago in the 1920s. Sociologist Ernest Burgess's prominent concentric circle model depicted urban areas as a series of concentric functional zones that sorted population groups. It proposed a central business core, circled by transitional immigrant and working class areas, then by more affluent outer commuter rings. In contrast, for example, the postmodernist Los Angeles School, primarily associated with the University of California at LA, viewed Los Angeles as a prototypical postmodern city, a "multi-nucleated megacity encompassing hundreds of municipalities", sprawling and centerless. The LA School analysis emphasized the global-local connection, pervasive social fragmentation, and a "reterritorialization of the urban process in which hinterland organizes the center (in direct contradiction to the Chicago model)".

A review of postmodern urbanism literature, published in 2018 in the Journal of Architectural and Planning Research, examined coverage of style, epoch, and method, noting a general lack of cohesive definition, and the use of questionable interpretation to form conceptual statements. The review concluded that as a theoretical construct, postmodern urbanism "is relevant to planning and design theory insofar as it rejects modernist 'rational' planning." However, given that urban planning and design are grounded in practice, postmodern theoretical ideas offer "little insight that professionals can use."

== Political planning ==
In the 1960s, a view emerged of planning as an inherently normative and political activity. Advocates of this approach included Norman Dennis, Martin Meyerson, Edward C. Banfield, Paul Davidoff, and Norton E. Long, the latter remarking that:

Plans are policies and policies, in a democracy at any rate, spell politics. The question is not whether planning will reflect politics but whose politics it will reflect. What values and whose values will planners seek to implement? . . . No longer can the planner take refuge in the neutrality of the objectivity of the personally uninvolved scientist.

The choices between alternative end points in planning was a key issue which was seen as political.

=== Participatory planning ===
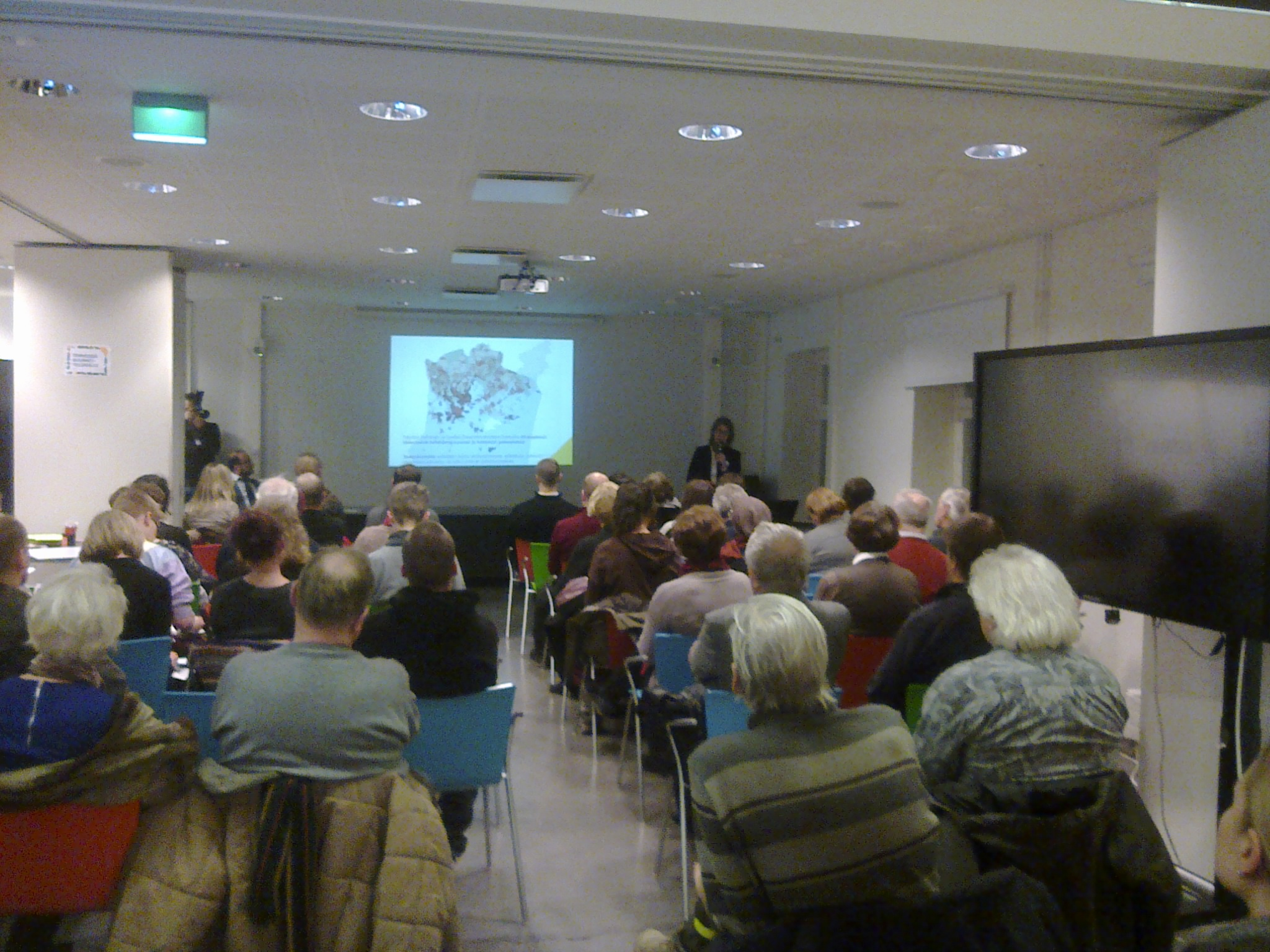
A public consultation event about urban planning in Helsinki.

Participatory planning is an urban planning paradigm that emphasizes involving the entire community in the strategic and management processes of urban planning; or, community-level planning processes, urban or rural. It is often considered as part of community development. Participatory planning aims to harmonize views among all of its participants as well as prevent conflict between opposing parties. In addition, marginalized groups have an opportunity to participate in the planning process.

Patrick Geddes had first advocated for the "real and active participation" of citizens when working in the British Raj, arguing against the "Dangers of Municipal Government from above" which would cause "detachment from public and popular feeling, and consequently, before long, from public and popular needs and usefulness". Further on, self-build was researched by Raymond Unwin in the 1930s in his Town Planning in Practice. The Italian anarchist architect Giancarlo De Carlo then argued in 1948 that "“The housing problem cannot be solved from above. It is a problem of the people, and it will not be solved, or even boldly faced, except by the concrete will and action of the people themselves", and that planning should exist "as the manifestation of communal collaboration". Through the Architectural Association School of Architecture, his ideas caught John Turner, who started working in Peru with Eduardo Neira. He would go on working in Lima from the mid-'50s to the mid-'60s. There he found that the barrios were not slums, but were rather highly organised and well-functioning. As a result, he came to the conclusion that:

"When dwellers control the major decisions and are free to make their own contributions in the design, construction or management of their housing, both this process and the environment produced stimulate individual and social well-being. When people have no control over nor responsibility for key decisions in the housing process, on the other hand, dwelling environments may instead become a barrier to personal fulfillment and a burden on the economy."

The role of the government was to provide a framework within which people would be able to work freely, for example by providing them the necessary resources, infrastructure and land. Self-build was later again taken up by Christopher Alexander, who led a project called People Rebuild Berkeley in 1972, with the aim to create "self-sustaining, self-governing" communities, though it ended up being closer to traditional planning.

=== Synoptic planning ===
After the "fall" of blueprint planning in the late 1950s and early 1960s, the synoptic model began to emerge as a dominant force in planning. Lane (2005) describes synoptic planning as having four central elements:

"(1) an enhanced emphasis on the specification of goals and targets; (2) an emphasis on quantitative analysis and predication of the environment; (3) a concern to identify and evaluate alternative policy options; and (4) the evaluation of means against ends (page 289)."

Public participation was first introduced into this model and it was generally integrated into the system process described above. However, the problem was that the idea of a single public interest still dominated attitudes, effectively devaluing the importance of participation because it suggests the idea that the public interest is relatively easy to find and only requires the most minimal form of participation.

==== Transactive planning ====
Transactive planning was a radical break from previous models. Instead of considering public participation as a method that would be used in addition to the normal training planning process, participation was a central goal. For the first time, the public was encouraged to take on an active role in the policy-setting process, while the planner took on the role of a distributor of information and a feedback source. Transactive planning focuses on interpersonal dialogue that develops ideas, which will be turned into action. One of the central goals is mutual learning where the planner gets more information on the community and citizens to become more educated about planning issues.

=== Advocacy planning ===
Formulated in the 1960s by lawyer and planning scholar Paul Davidoff, the advocacy planning model takes the perspective that there are large inequalities in the political system and in the bargaining process between groups that result in large numbers of people unorganized and unrepresented in the process. It concerns itself with ensuring that all people are equally represented in the planning process by advocating for the interests of the underprivileged and seeking social change. Again, public participation is a central tenet of this model. A plurality of public interests is assumed, and the role of the planner is essentially the one as a facilitator who either advocates directly for underrepresented groups directly or encourages them to become part of the process.

=== Radical planning ===
Radical planning is a stream of urban planning which seeks to manage development in an equitable and community-based manner. The seminal text to the radical planning movement is Foundations for a Radical Concept in Planning (1973), by Stephen Grabow and Allen Heskin. Grabow and Heskin provided a critique of planning as elitist, centralizing and change-resistant, and proposed a new paradigm based upon systems change, decentralization, communal society, facilitation of human development and consideration of ecology. Grabow and Heskin were joined by Head of Department of Town Planning from the Polytechnic of the South Bank Shean McConnell, and his 1981 work Theories for Planning.

In 1987 John Friedmann entered the fray with Planning in the Public Domain: From Knowledge to Action, promoting a radical planning model based on "decolonization", "democratization", "self-empowerment" and "reaching out". Friedmann described this model as an "Agropolitan development" paradigm, emphasizing the re-localization of primary production and manufacture. In "Toward a Non-Euclidian Mode of Planning" (1993) Friedmann further promoted the urgency of decentralizing planning, advocating a planning paradigm that is normative, innovative, political, transactive and based on a social learning approach to knowledge and policy.

=== Bargaining model ===
The bargaining model views planning as the result of giving and take on the part of a number of interests who are all involved in the process. It argues that this bargaining is the best way to conduct planning within the bounds of legal and political institutions. The most interesting part of this theory of planning is that it makes public participation the central dynamic in the decision-making process. Decisions are made first and foremost by the public, and the planner plays a more minor role.

=== Communicative approach ===
The communicative approach to planning is perhaps the most difficult to explain. It focuses on using communication to help different interests in the process to understand each other. The idea is that each individual will approach a conversation with his or her own subjective experience in mind and that from that conversation shared goals and possibilities will emerge. Again, participation plays a central role in this model. The model seeks to include a broad range of voice to enhance the debate and negotiation that is supposed to form the core of actual plan making. In this model, participation is actually fundamental to the planning process happening. Without the involvement of concerned interests, there is no planning.

Looking at each of these models it becomes clear that participation is not only shaped by the public in a given area or by the attitude of the planning organization or planners that work for it. In fact, public participation is largely influenced by how planning is defined, how planning problems are defined, the kinds of knowledge that planners choose to employ and how the planning context is set. Though some might argue that is too difficult to involve the public through transactive, advocacy, bargaining, and communicative models because transportation is some ways more technical than other fields, transportation is perhaps unique among planning fields in that its systems depend on the interaction of a number of individuals and organizations.

== Process ==
Blight may sometimes cause communities to consider redeveloping and urban planning.

=== Changes to the planning process ===
Strategic Urban Planning over past decades have witnessed the metamorphosis of the role of the urban planner in the planning process. More citizens calling for democratic planning & development processes have played a huge role in allowing the public to make important decisions as part of the planning process. Community organizers and social workers are now very involved in planning from the grassroots level. The term advocacy planning was coined by Paul Davidoff in his influential 1965 paper, "Advocacy and Pluralism in Planning" which acknowledged the political nature of planning and urged planners to acknowledge that their actions are not value-neutral and encouraged minority and underrepresented voices to be part of planning decisions. Benveniste argued that planners had a political role to play and had to bend some truth to power if their plans were to be implemented.

Developers have also played huge roles in development, particularly by planning projects. Many recent developments were results of large and small-scale developers who purchased land, designed the district and constructed the development from scratch. The Melbourne Docklands, for example, was largely an initiative pushed by private developers to redevelop the waterfront into a high-end residential and commercial district.

Recent theories of urban planning, espoused, for example by Salingaros see the city as an adaptive system that grows according to process similar to those of plants. They say that urban planning should thus take its cues from such natural processes. Such theories also advocate participation by inhabitants in the design of the urban environment, as opposed to simply leaving all development to large-scale construction firms.

In the process of creating an urban plan or urban design, carrier-infill is one mechanism of spatial organization in which the city's figure and ground components are considered separately. The urban figure, namely buildings, is represented as total possible building volumes, which are left to be designed by architects in the following stages. The urban ground, namely in-between spaces and open areas, are designed to a higher level of detail. The carrier-infill approach is defined by an urban design performing as the carrying structure that creates the shape and scale of the spaces, including future building volumes that are then infilled by architects' designs. The contents of the carrier structure may include street pattern, landscape architecture, open space, waterways, and other infrastructure. The infill structure may contain zoning, building codes, quality guidelines, and Solar Access based upon a solar envelope. Carrier-Infill urban design is differentiated from complete urban design, such as in the monumental axis of Brasília, in which the urban design and architecture were created together.

In carrier-infill urban design or urban planning, the negative space of the city, including landscape, open space, and infrastructure is designed in detail. The positive space, typically building a site for future construction, is only represented in unresolved volumes. The volumes are representative of the total possible building envelope, which can then be infilled by individual architects.

== See also ==
- Index of urban planning articles
- Index of urban studies articles
- List of planned cities
- List of planning journals
- List of urban planners
- List of urban theorists
- MONU – magazine on urbanism
- Planetizen
- Transition Towns (network)
- Transportation demand management
- Urban acupuncture
- Urban vitality
