= Matthew Westfall =

Matthew Westfall is an American writer, urbanist, and award-winning documentary filmmaker.

== Personal life ==
He was born in New York City and was raised in Brookline, Massachusetts. He currently resides in the Philippines with his wife Laurie and their three daughters.

== Career ==
As a documentary filmmaker, he made films narrated by Malcolm McDowell, Willem Dafoe, and F. Murray Abraham.

As a writer, he wrote the book The Devil's Causeway: The True Story of America's First Prisoners of War in the Philippines, and the Heroic Expedition Sent to Their Rescue, which was praised by 12th Philippine President Fidel V. Ramos, as "an epic tale of military campaigning and colonial conquest" and "an inspiring story of courage, sacrifice, and patriotism by the various protagonists – regardless of nationality."

== Award ==
He received the Paul Davidoff National Award for Advocacy Planning from the American Planning Association for his documentary On Borrowed Land executive produced by Oliver Stone and funded by the John D. and Catherine T. MacArthur Foundation.
