= Leonie Sandercock =

Australian academic

Leonie Sandercok
- Born: 1949; Adelaide, Australia
- Education: University of Adelaide, University of California at Los Angeles, Australian National University
- Occupations: Urban planner, Professor
- Spouse: John Friedmann

Leonie Sandercock (born 1949) is an urban planner and academic focusing on community planning and multiculturalism. Her work spans the interdisciplinary fields of urban studies, urban policy and planning and elucidates issues of difference, social justice and possibility. As of 2023, Sandercock was a professor at the School of Community & Regional Planning at University of British Columbia.

== Education and career ==
Sandercock studied under Hugh Stretton at the University of Adelaide, receiving a BA (Hons) in 1970. She pursued a PhD in Urban Research at the Australian National University from 1971-1974 In Sydney, Sandercock met Jack Mundey and offered to support the Builders Labourers Federation. In 1981 Sandercock became Professor and Head of Graduate Urban Studies at Macquarie University. She later moved to Los Angeles and received a MFA (screenwriting) from University of California (1989).

She has served as a senior academic in Australia at Macquarie University, RMIT University and the University of Melbourne, as well as UCLA. Sandercock was married to John Friedmann.

When consulting for the Government of South Australia, Sandercock was tasked on how to incorporate public participation when building a new town about 50 miles from Adelaide, to reduce housing demand in existing metro areas. As part of reading for six months on public consultation policy she wrote her thesis Cities for sale: property, politics and urban planning in Australia (later published as a book), which Robert Freestone described as a "triumvirate of classic 1970s books" on Australian planning (along with works by Hugh Stretton and Peter Spearitt). It was reissued intact fifteen years later.

Sandercock joined the University of British Columbia in 2001, serving as Director from 2006 to 2007.

From 2010, Leonie worked on a new curriculum, Indigenous Community Planning, within the master's degree in Planning at the School of Community & Regional Planning at the University of British Columbia. This curriculum was designed and delivered in partnership with the Musqueam First Nation. In 2014 there were 12 students enrolled in the ICP program.

In 2023, Sandercock published a collection of her writings in Mapping Possibility: Finding Purpose and Hope in Community Planning. She chose not to include any work in Australia from 1974 to 1986, stating it was specific to the Australian political context of urban policy at the time and therefore dated, that international readers were likely not interested "in events in this small faraway country", and that she found it hard to identify with the young voice and confident language.

== Selected publications ==
- Sandercock, L and Attili, G (2014) 'Changing the Lens: Film as Action Research and Therapeutic Planning Practice', Journal of Planning Education and Research.
- Sandercock, L and Attili, G (2010) Multimedia Explorations in Urban Policy and Planning, Springer (ISBN 9789048132089)
- Attili, G and Sandercock, L (2010) Finding Our Way, 90 minute documentary, Vancouver: Moving Images.
- Sandercock, L and Attili, G (2009) Where Strangers Become Neighbours: integrating immigrants in Vancouver, Canada, Springer, (ISBN 9781402090349)
- Attili, G and Sandercock, L (2007) Where Strangers Become Neighbours, 50 minute documentary, Montreal: National Film Board of Canada
- Sandercock, L (2003) Cosmopolis II: Mongrel Cities in the 21st Century, London: Continuum (ISBN 0826470459 and 0826464637 (pbk.))
- Sandercock, L (1998) Towards Cosmopolis: planning for multicultural cities, London: John Wiley (ISBN 0471971979 and 0471971987 (pbk))
- Sandercock, L (Ed)(1998) Making the invisible visible : a multicultural planning history, Berkeley : University of California Press (ISBN 0520207343 (alk. paper) 052020735 (pbk))
- Sandercock, L (1990) Property, Politics, and Urban Planning: a history of Australian city planning, 1890-1990, Brunswick, New Jersey: Transaction Press.
- Sandercock, L (1979) The Land Racket, Canberra: Silverfish.
- Sandercock, L (1975) Cities for sale : property, politics and urban planning in Australia, Carlton, Vic. : Melbourne University Press (ISBN 052284085X)
