= Le Corbusier in the USSR =

Projects by the Swiss architect in the USSR, 1928–1932

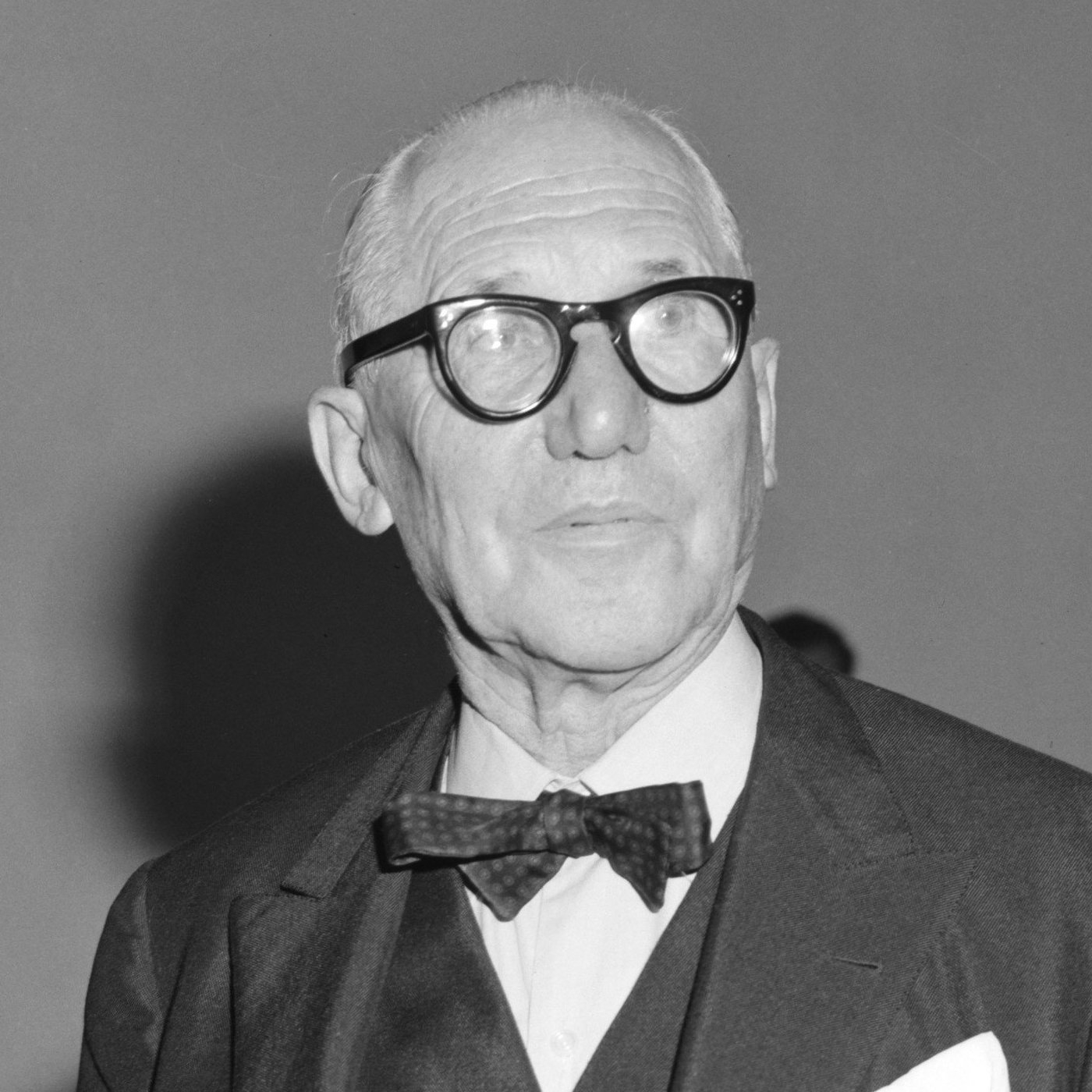
- Le Corbusier
- Occupation: Architect
- Projects: Tsentrosoyuz building, Palace of the Soviets

Le Corbusier had a short relationship with the Soviet Union, starting with his first trip to Moscow in 1928, and ending with the rejection of his proposal for the Palace of the Soviets in 1932. Nevertheless, the short-lived relationship had consequences that went beyond Le Corbusier's time in the USSR. Before his trip to Moscow, Le Corbusier was already an influential figure within the Soviet architecture profession. In 1922, Moisei Ginzburg, founder of the Constructivist movement, published materials from Le Corbusier's “Towards a New Architecture.” Corbusier's projects were frequently published and analyzed as examples for young Soviet architects. When Le Corbusier died in 1965, the official newspaper of the Soviet Union, Pravda, stated in its obituary, “Modern architecture has lost its greatest master.”

== 1928 trip ==
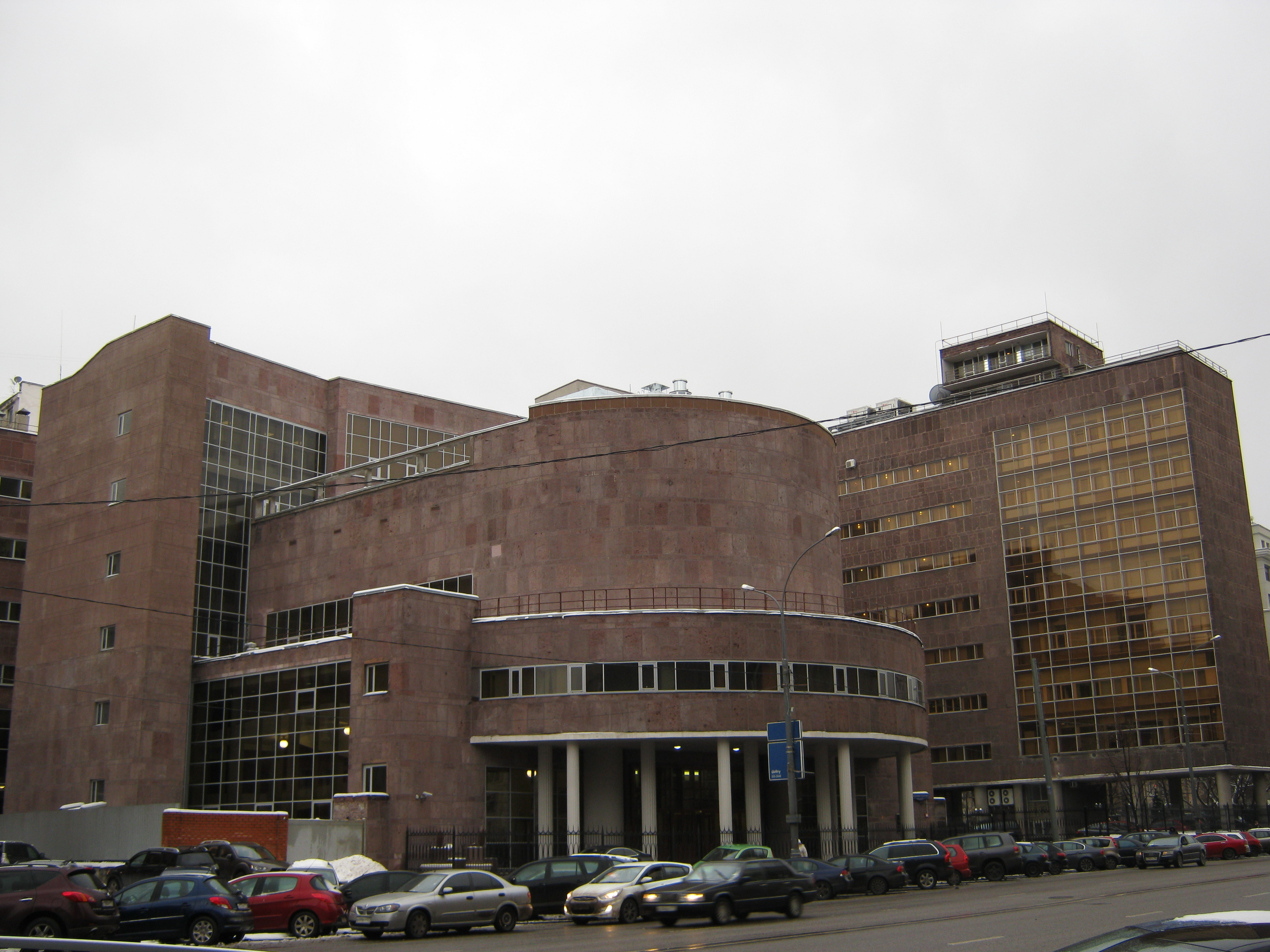
Tsentrosoyuz building

In 1928, Le Corbusier was invited to participate in a closed competition, which included Peter Behrens, Max Taut, and the Vesnin brothers, for the new headquarters of the Central Union of Consumer Cooperatives in Moscow. After winning the competition, Le Corbusier in October 1928 traveled to the Soviet Union to inspect the site for the Tsentrosoyuz building. Before his trip, Le Corbusier frequented the “Amis de Spartacus” film club, which projected banned Soviet avant-garde films, like Sergei Eisenstein’s Battleship Potemkin. When he arrived, Pravda heralded his arrival on its front page. It announced, “To Moscow has come Le Corbusier, the most brilliant representative of today’s advanced architectural thought in Europe.” In Moscow, Le Corbusier gave a lecture at the Polytechnic Museum. He would later write of his trip in his diary, “My works have passed the blockade. I am very well known, very popular. My lectures are held before a packed assembly."

While in the USSR, Le Corbusier had a young Moscow architecture student named Sergei Kozhin, a former assistant to Ivan Zholtovsky, as his official guide. Besides assisting the Swiss architect with the work for the commission of the Tsentrosoyuz, Kozhin would also introduce Le Corbusier to Russian society. Kozhin took Le Corbusier to the Russian countryside, to a village sixty-five kilometers from Moscow, where Le Corbusier had a first hand account of the conditions of the peripheries of Soviet society as well as traditional Russian wooden architecture. This face-to-face contact would later allow him to write off Soviet society as incapable and unprepared to appreciate modern architecture when his design for the Palace of the Soviets was rejected in 1932.

== The Atmosphere of Moscow ==
Le Corbusier left Moscow in 1928 with a positive view of the Soviet Union. Indeed, his time there would prove influential in the development of his own theories on architecture and urban planning. In 1930, in his Precisions on the Present: State of Architecture and City Planning, Le Corbusier included a report on his observations of Moscow, written en route back to Paris from Moscow. In this report, Le Corbusier reflects on the Five Year Plan and the “green city” plan that the Constructivist architects had developed.

The Five Year Plan required the development of many industrializing projects. Le Corbusier stated that it presented a battery firing modern technology. Moscow, as he saw it, was a factor for making plans. In his eyes, the development of plans for new buildings in the Soviet Union were being done through whatever means brought progress. Reflecting on the difference between the profession of architecture in Paris and Moscow, Le Corbusier highlights the superfluous involvement of the youth in the Soviet Union, while in France and other parts of Europe, academicism prohibited the youthful from the competitiveness of invention.

With such youthful, inventive spirit, as Le Corbusier analyzes, the constructivist developed innovative planning schemes. The “green town,” as he analyzes in “Atmosphere of Moscow,” was born out of the necessity of a rest period, introduced by the USSR as a response to the constant labor. The rest period would come on the fifth day of the week, in this way suppressing Sunday's traditional role. The green town was then created to provide the space in which such rest would be carried out. Capable of housing 100,000 people at once, the green town would in 15 days provide rest for the entire population of Moscow, (1.5 million), in accordance with the rotation of the rest period every 5 days. Additionally, the town would also house for periods of two weeks to a month city officials or workers taking their annual vacation. The city would also be a space for the ill “from work” to find sanatoria. Beyond this, Le Corbusier also elaborates on the collaborative living that such a city requires: a collective farm would provide food for the entire city; people would live in hostel-type program with common rooms; people would be separated by age, providing different recreational programs for each group. These observations would later serve as the basis for his “Response to Moscow,” as well as his elaboration of the Radiant City.

== Response to Moscow ==
In 1931, Soviet officials inquired Le Corbusier's opinion on the reconstruction of the city of Moscow. While in Moscow in 1928, he had taken some quick, hidden (it was prohibited to draw in the streets for fear of espionage) sketches on the city and noted that its plan was “that of the age of the horse.” At the packed conference held at the Polytechnic Museum, he had discussed the significance of city planning and the city's future, yet at the time Le Corbusier had not been interested in Moscow itself. After his trip, the Soviet Union seemed a central preoccupation. Le Corbusier responded with a 59-page report, “Response to Moscow,” in which he sketched his ideas for the city. Unfortunately, his initial response is not yet available, hidden in private Russian collections. Nevertheless, his response to such inquiry produced the theoretical basis for Ville Radieuse, the Radiant City. That such an important concept for urbanism derived from Le Corbusier's answer to the Soviet questionnaire suggests the important imprint of the Soviet Union in his career.

In his response, Le Corbusier developed a plan similar to that proposed by the constructivists for the Green Town. The collectivist spirit that the constructivist had envisioned for their own instantly seduced Le Corbusier, and he in turn implemented these to his own ideas of planning. Much like the Green Town of the Constructivists, in this radiant city for Moscow Le Corbusier utilized services communes, or communal facilities. In it, he also proposed the radical destruction of much of the historic center of Moscow, and advocated the creation of separate cities with separate functions, an idea he had already presented in Moscow during his 1928 trip there. Envisioning the new city with a ruthlessness that Haussmann would have envied, Le Corbusier placed upon the radial plan of the ancient city a roughly rectilinear organization comparable to his earlier tabula-rasa program of Villa Contemporaine.

His “Response to Moscow” was not fit for Soviet society, the authorities that reviewed the response believed. In the end, such a plan for Moscow was never carried out. Despite this, Le Corbusier did not abandon the project all together but rather used his documents on the project for his own personal ends. He later presented a modified version of his study to the CIAM, removing all references to the Soviet city, labeling it “Villa Radieuse.”

== Le Corbusier’s Palace of the Soviet ==
Le Corbusier submitted designs for the competition for the Palace of the Soviets in 1931, which he lost and in effect would end his relationship with the Soviet Union. After he submitted his design for the first entry, Le Corbusier was informed that his submission had caused considerable stir. No winner was announced for this first round, but he was notified that as a formidable contestant in first entry his project would go on to the second round of the competition. With this, Le Corbusier had reasonable grounds to believe that his project would be among the finalists, if not the winner. But on February 28, 1932, when Boris Iofan’s neo-classical entry was announced as the winner of the second public competition by the Soviet judges, Le Corbusier was unprepared. Le Corbusier was outraged by the decision, and wrote letters illustrating such feelings, in effect only showing to the Soviet judges his great egotism. But, with the winner announced, it was evident that Le Corbusier’s modernist style was losing ground in the Soviet Union. Even the national newspaper, which only a few years earlier heralded his first visit to the city of Moscow, now mocked his design entry as a “congress hangar.” The high modernism that young Soviet architects aspired to only a few years earlier was being replaced by a socialist realism best illustrated by neo-classical architecture. Le Corbusier's failure in this project, which in the eyes of the world marked a spectacular reversal in soviet architectural style, would prove to be his final dream and ultimate humiliation in his Moscow adventure. In the end, Le Corbusier's relationship with Russia would end in disappointment.
