= Advocacy planning =

Theory of urban planning

Advocacy planning is a theory of urban planning that was formulated in the 1960s by Paul Davidoff and Linda Stone Davidoff. It is a pluralistic and inclusive planning theory where planners seek to represent the interests of various groups within society. Davidoff (1965) was an activist lawyer and planner who believed that advocacy planning was a necessary method for representing the low-income and minority groups who were not always on equal footing with the rich and powerful.

== Background and context ==
Before the 1960s, planning was usually performed by trained professionals within local governments who worked directly under the guidance of planning commissions. This method of planning is commonly referred to as top down and was a result of the planning practices that developed throughout history. Top down is characterised by its authoritative and undemocratic methods, where institutions and individuals plan without first consulting the various stakeholders who are involved with the use and development of the land. An example of this approach is colonialism in Africa during the early nineteenth century, where settlements were created simply for the purpose of exploiting workers and extracting the wealth produced by them.

This attitude to planning continued beyond colonialism and spread throughout the modernist movement in the 1920s. During this time, designers and planners were given opportunities to conceive a vision for utopian cities. These designs were a response to the rise of industrialisation in cities, which led to the working class living in dirty and often overcrowded slums. Although the vision and intention of these utopian cities was to create a society that sought to protect and preserve humanity through the built environment, this top down method of planning assumes that the values and beliefs held by the planner are the same as those that they are planning for. Many of these projects failed to achieve expectations and were instead discarded or set aside.

Directly following modernism and continuing this trend of a top down approach was the post world war period of reconstruction and planning. With the war over, there was a need for social and economic reconstruction. Governments were given the task to rebuild cities that had been afflicted by the damage left behind from the war. With the rise of the technocratic experts, they were consulted to design and plan the city in a scientific, logical and rigorous manner which would produce the best outcome for all stakeholders. This disconnected and elitist approach led to the constant failure of the government to meet the needs of its citizens and was met with backlash, giving rise to alternative planning practices.

== Process ==
Davidoff understood that not all stakeholders are equally represented and involved in the planning process. Leaving the groups of lower socioeconomic status vulnerable to the interests of larger public institutions or private companies. Without sufficient protection and care, the concerns and opinions of these individuals were left unheard and unaccounted for when developing plans. Davidoff realized that it was necessary to implement a “humanistic, grassroots and pluralistic” system where planners would advocate for the interests of the oppressed and powerless.

In practice advocacy planners use their experience and knowledge within the field of planning to represent the ideas and needs of their clients. These clients are often groups of lower socioeconomic standing who are unable to access the resources, tools or skills to represent themselves. Advocate planners work with these disadvantaged groups to develop plans which incorporate and preserve their social and economic needs.

The plans are then produced in front of a planning commission where they consider the various pros and cons of each plan produced by other advocate planners. This is what Davidoff claimed would lead to a rigorous and systematic legal methodology of “fair notice and hearings, production of supporting evidence, cross-examination and reasoned decision” Allowing the planning commission to arrive at “a just decision”.

Davidoff believed that upholding the political ideology of democracy through the planning process led to three major improvements within his discipline.

First is the raising of the public’s awareness. By employing a method of participatory planning and engaging with the wider community, this helps the public to realise that planning is not simply a process engaged by well educated men of science, rather that the best planners are the people themselves. It is the realisation that the public has the freedom and choice to develop plans according to their needs.

Secondly, this ideal structure for advocacy planning allows planners to compete among themselves while representing the views of their clients. Healthy amounts of competition should in fact raise the standard and quality of planning practices and outcomes. Davidoff acknowledges that “conflict keeps people honest”

Finally, rather than critiquing the planners and institutions that support them, those that are critical are given the opportunity to instead provide input and feedback on the plans with which they disagree. Creating an environment that encourages positive attitudes towards constructive participation.

However, simply providing a platform for expression is not always sufficient. Participatory and democratic planning requires a certain level of critical consciousness from the individual participating, otherwise they may struggle to identify problems without being aware of the larger social and economic forces that influence their choices. Moreover, aspects of capacity building and advocacy can themselves, somewhat ironically, serve to restrict autonomy by creating an over-dependence upon facilitatory bodies and advocates. The role of the advocate then, must be not only to provide assistance in developing an appropriate plan for the committee to judge, but must also be to encourage the people to be “free, informed, participating to the fullest degree, working together cooperatively, possessed of an understanding of their problems and those of their fellow men”
