= Garden Cities of To-morrow =

1898 book by Ebenezer Howard

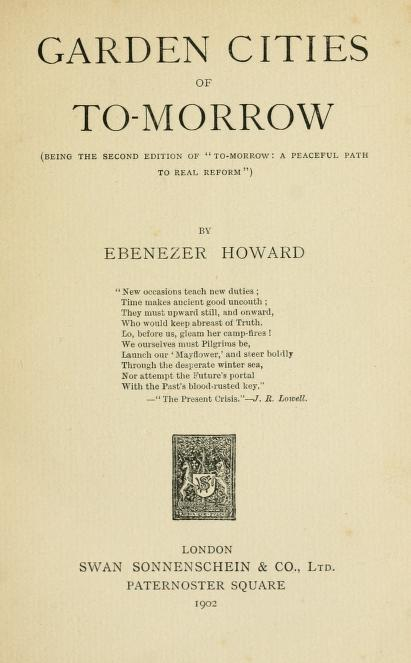
- Title page of second edition
- Author: Ebenezer Howard
- Original title: To-morrow: A Peaceful Path to Real Reform
- Language: English
- Published: 1898 by Swan Sonnenschein & Co. (original title)
- OCLC: 889830718
- Text: Garden Cities of To-morrow at Wikisource

Garden Cities of To-morrow is a book by the British urban planner Ebenezer Howard. When it was published in 1898, the book was titled To-morrow: A Peaceful Path to Real Reform. In 1902, it was reprinted as Garden Cities of To-Morrow. The book gave rise to the garden city movement and is very important in the field of urban design.

== Background ==
This book offered a vision of towns free of slums and enjoying the benefits of both town (such as opportunity, amusement, and high wages) and country (such as beauty, fresh air and low rents). Howard illustrated the idea with his "Three Magnets" diagram. His ideas were conceived for the context of a capitalist economic system and sought to balance individual and community needs.

Two English towns were built as garden cities, Letchworth and Welwyn. Though they did not completely measure up to the ideal, they provided a model for controlling urban sprawl.

== Diagrams from the 1898 edition ==
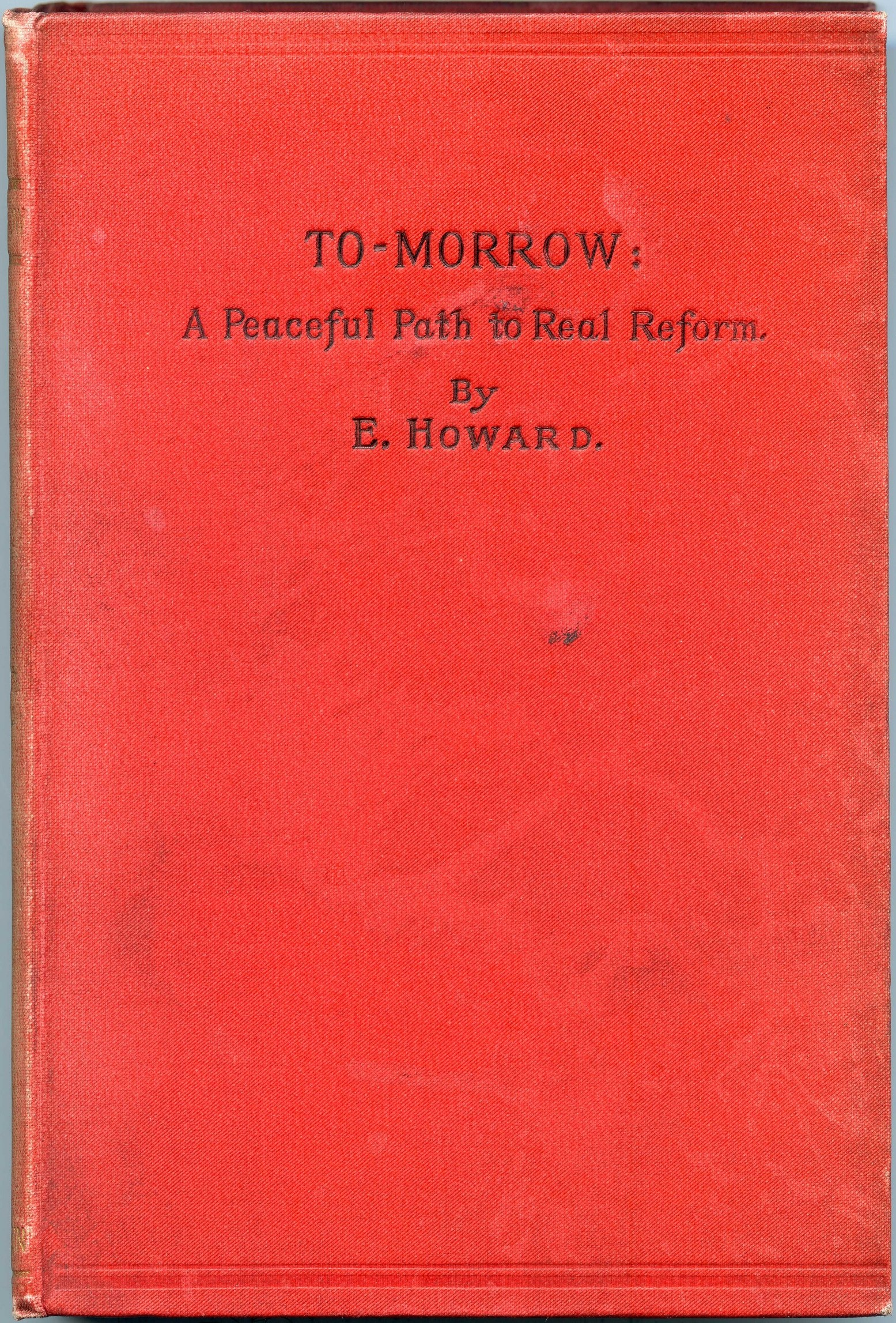
Ebenezer Howard, To-morrow: A Peaceful Path to Real Reform

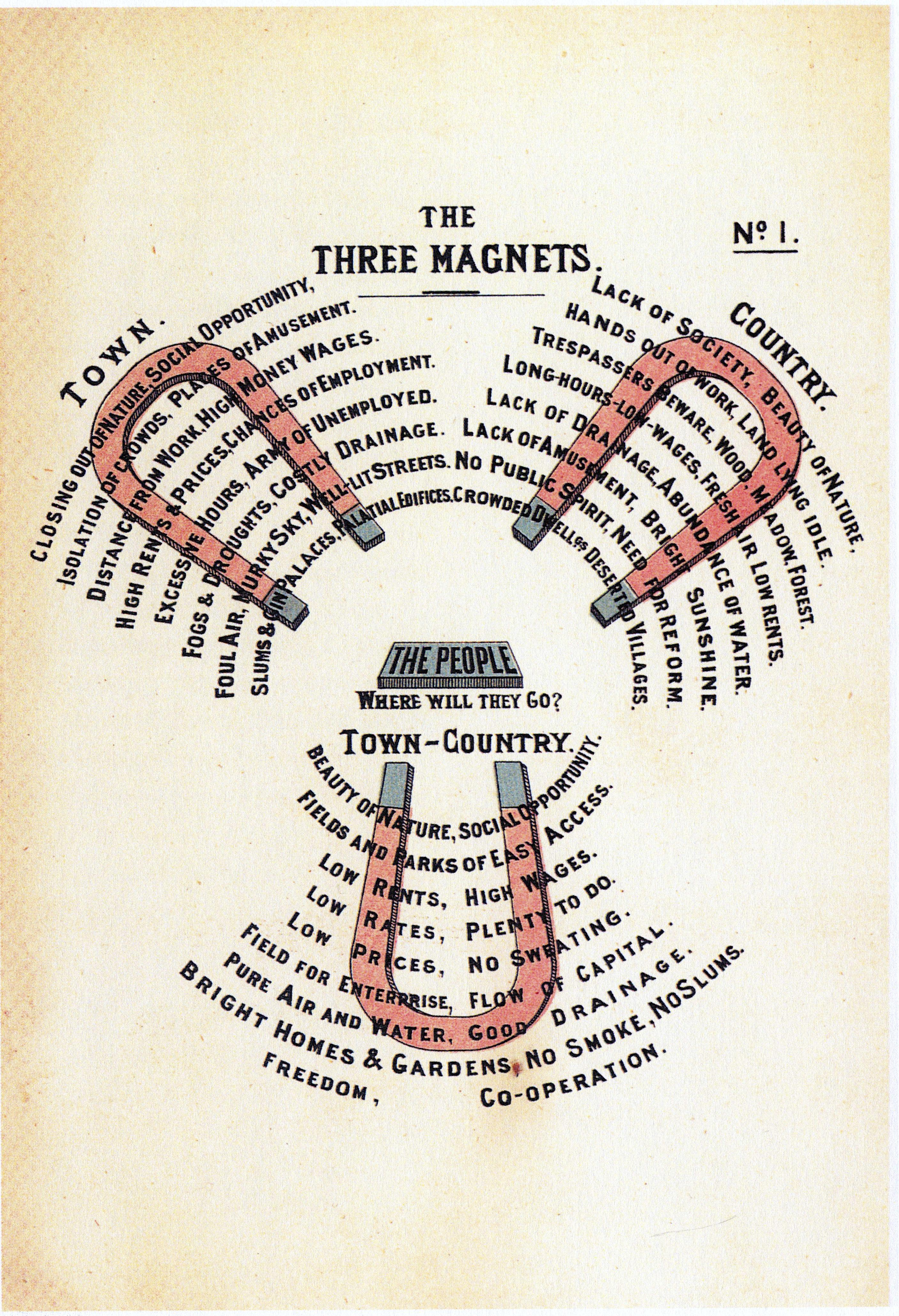
Diagram No.1: The Three Magnets (Ebenezer Howard, To-morrow: A Peaceful Path to Real Reform.)

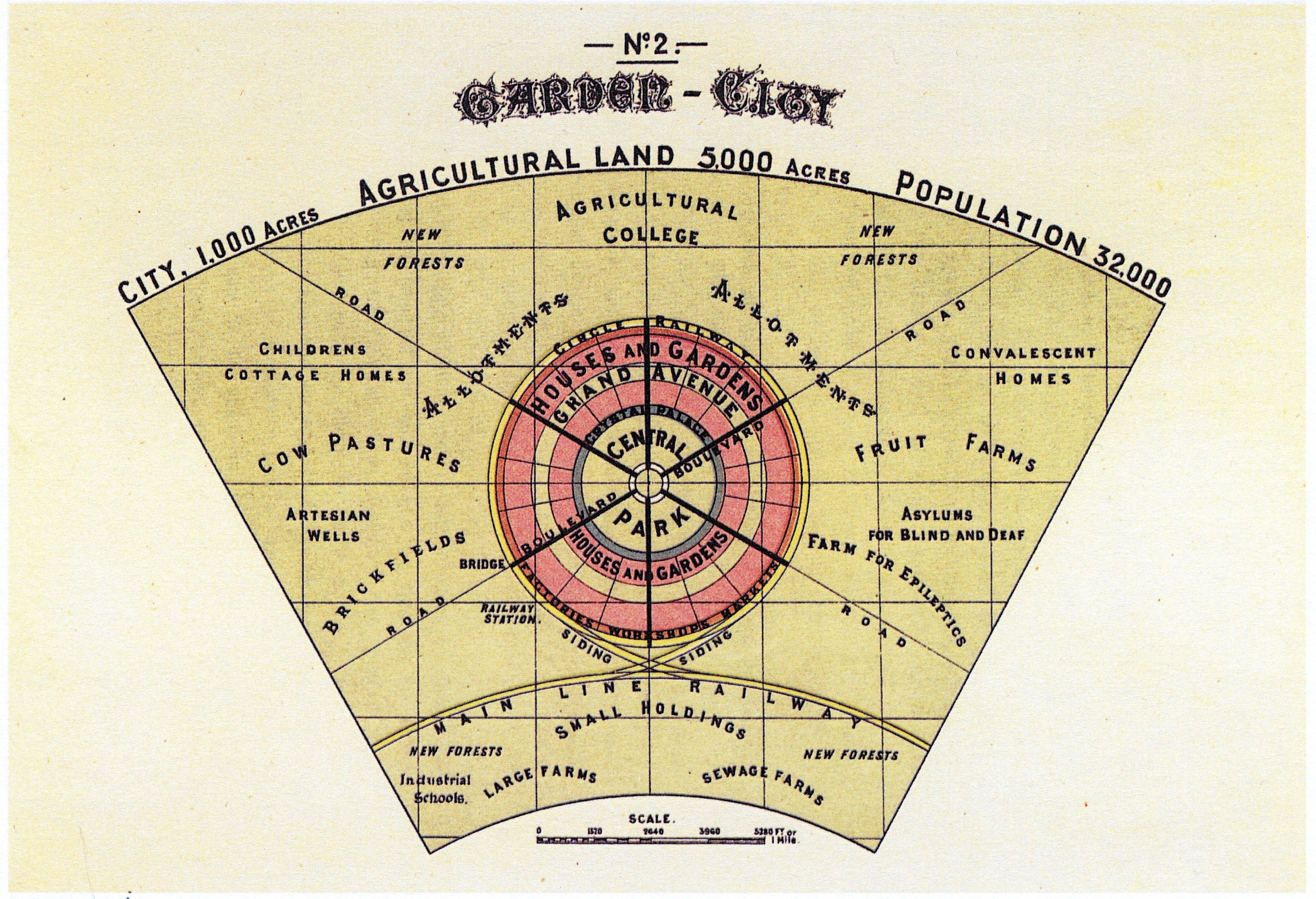
Diagram No.2 (Ebenezer Howard, To-morrow: A Peaceful Path to Real Reform.)

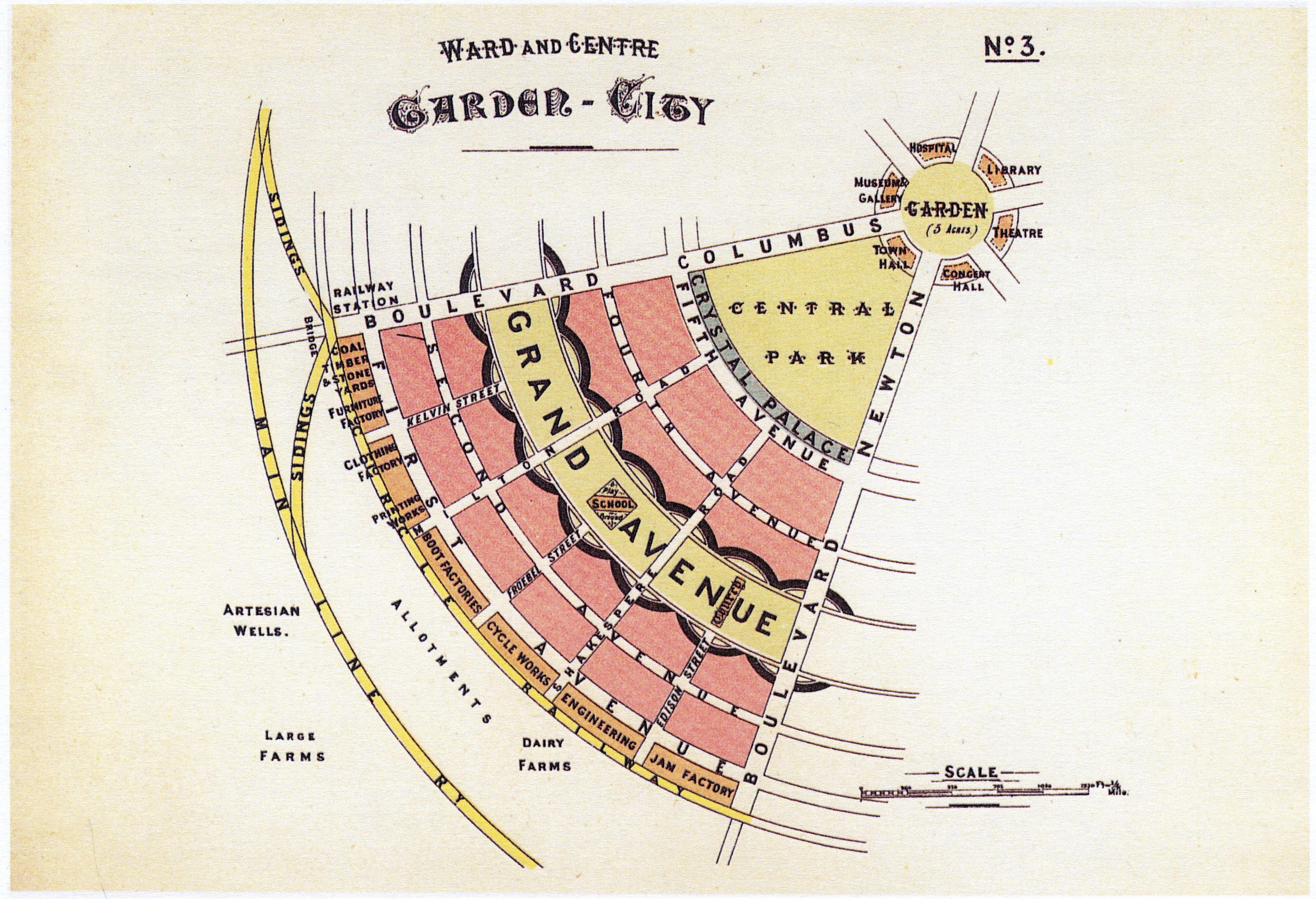
Diagram No.3 (Ebenezer Howard, To-morrow: A Peaceful Path to Real Reform.)

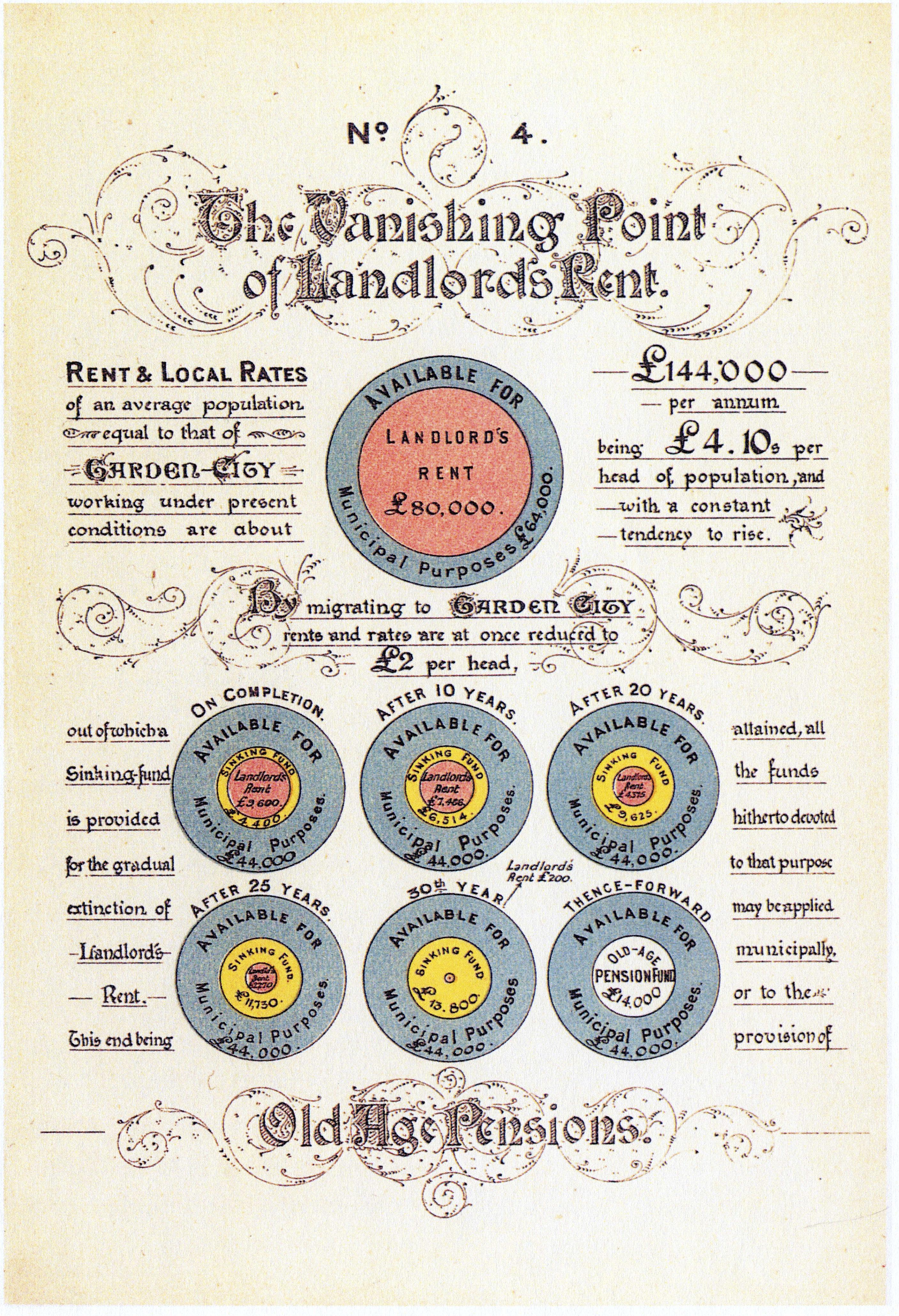
Diagram No.4 (Ebenezer Howard, To-morrow: A Peaceful Path to Real Reform.)

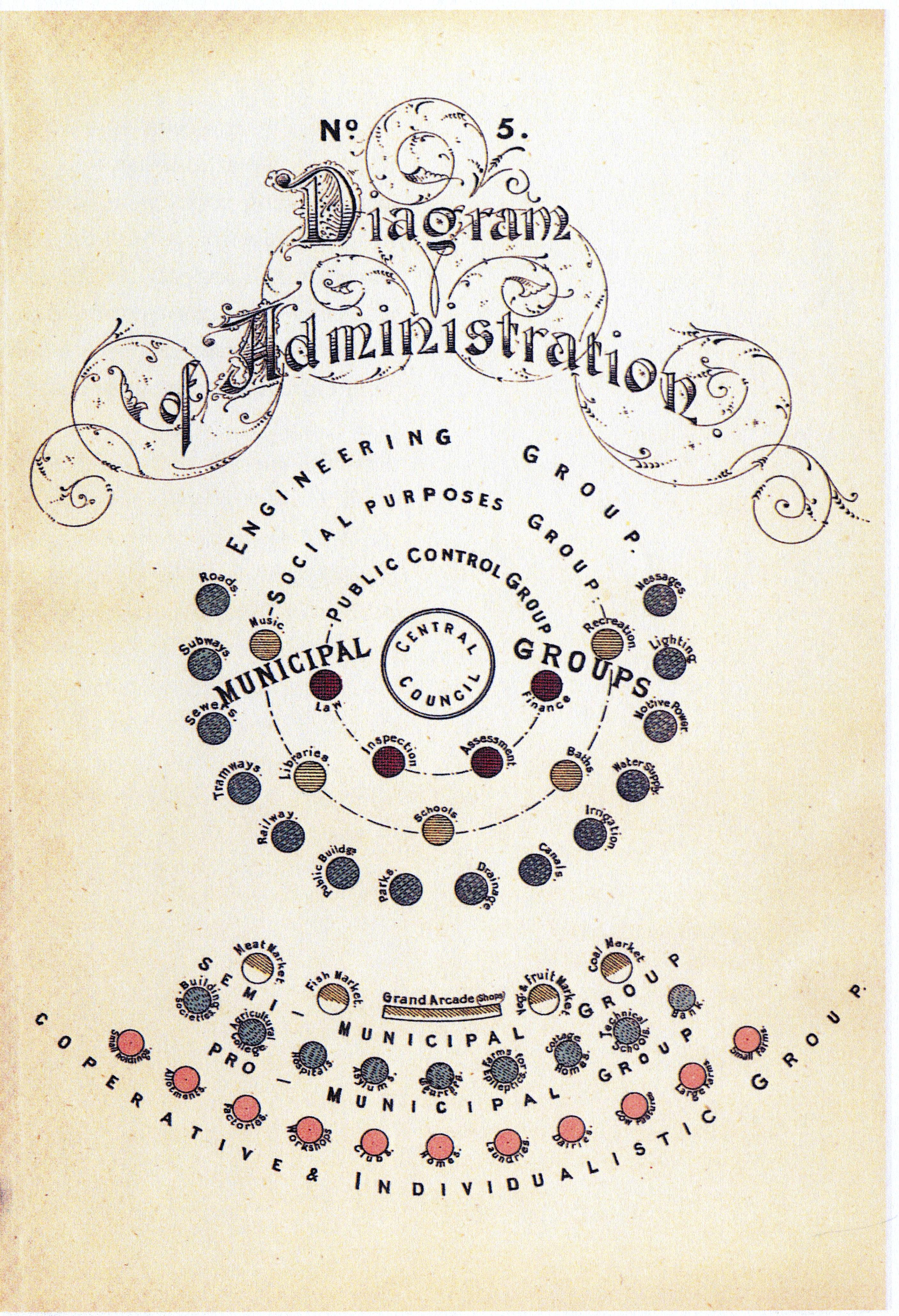
Diagram No.5 (Ebenezer Howard, To-morrow: A Peaceful Path to Real Reform.)

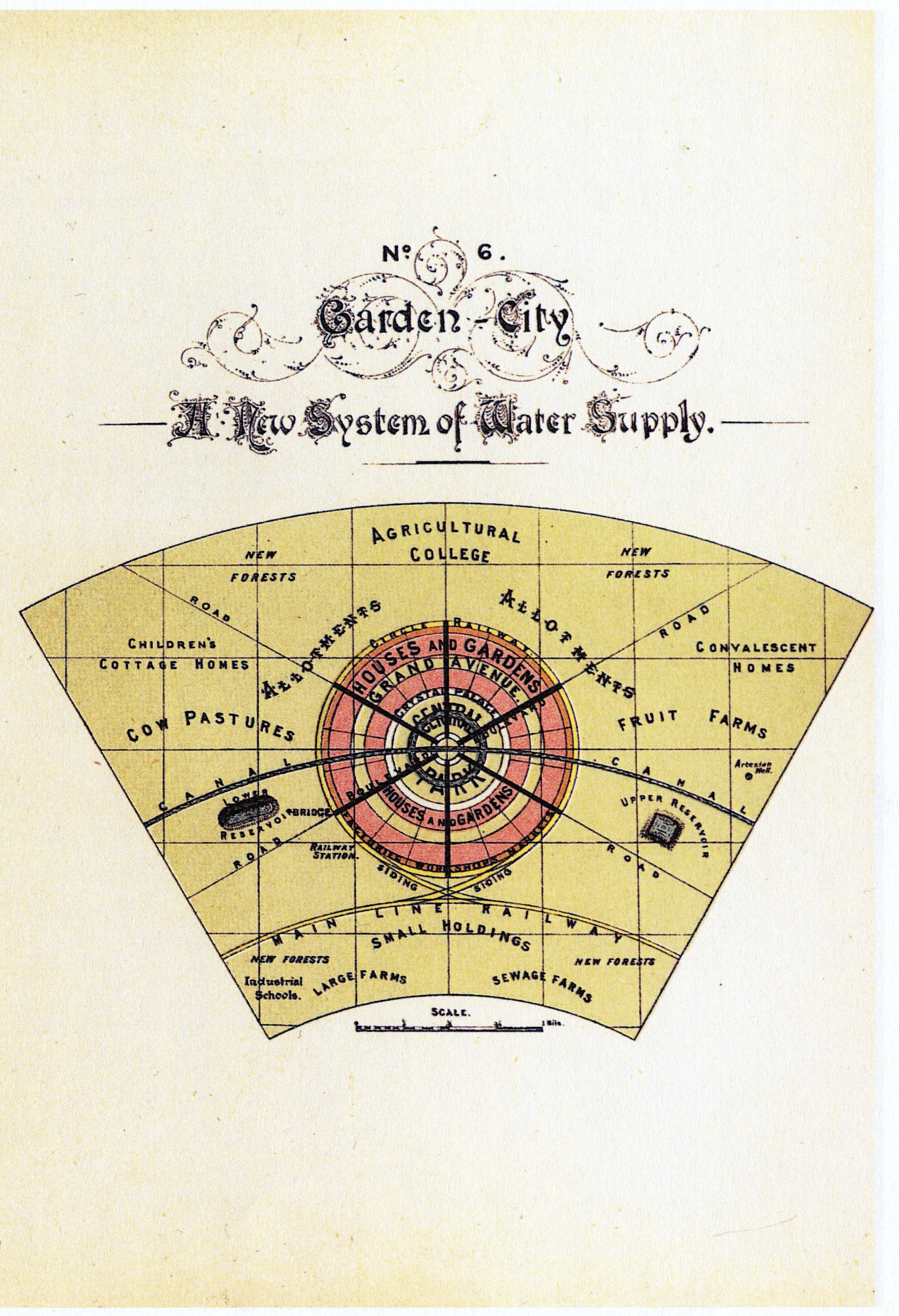
Diagram No.6 (Ebenezer Howard, To-morrow: A Peaceful Path to Real Reform.)

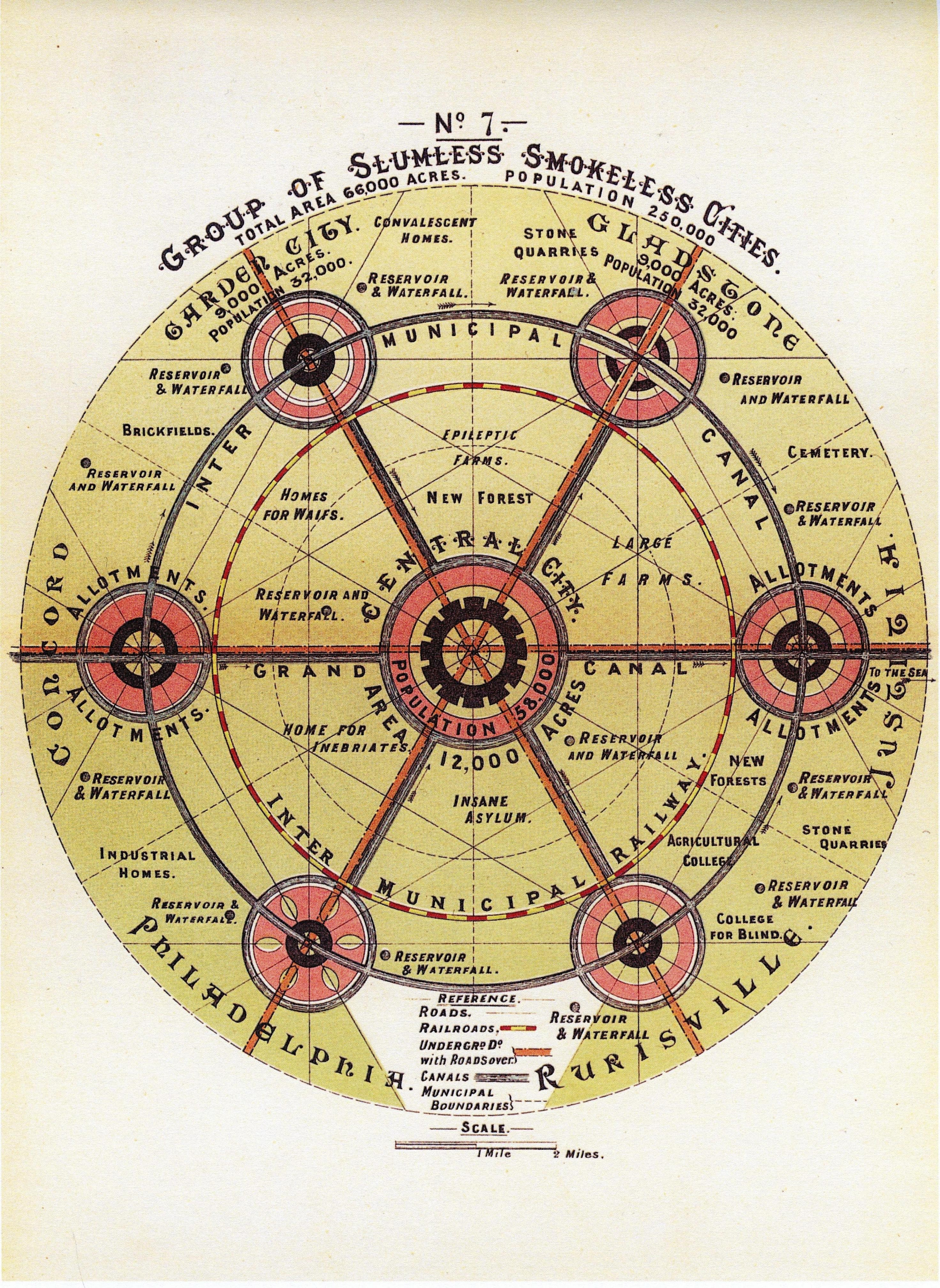
Diagram No.7 (Ebenezer Howard, To-morrow: A Peaceful Path to Real Reform.)

== Diagrams from the 1902 edition ==
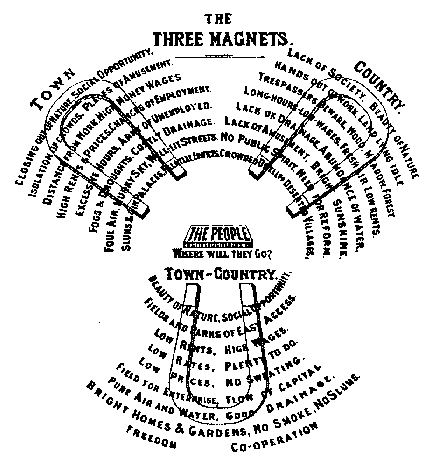
Howard's "Three Magnets" diagram which addressed the question "Where will the people go?", the choices being "Town", "Country" or "Town-Country."

== Diagrams from the 1922 edition ==
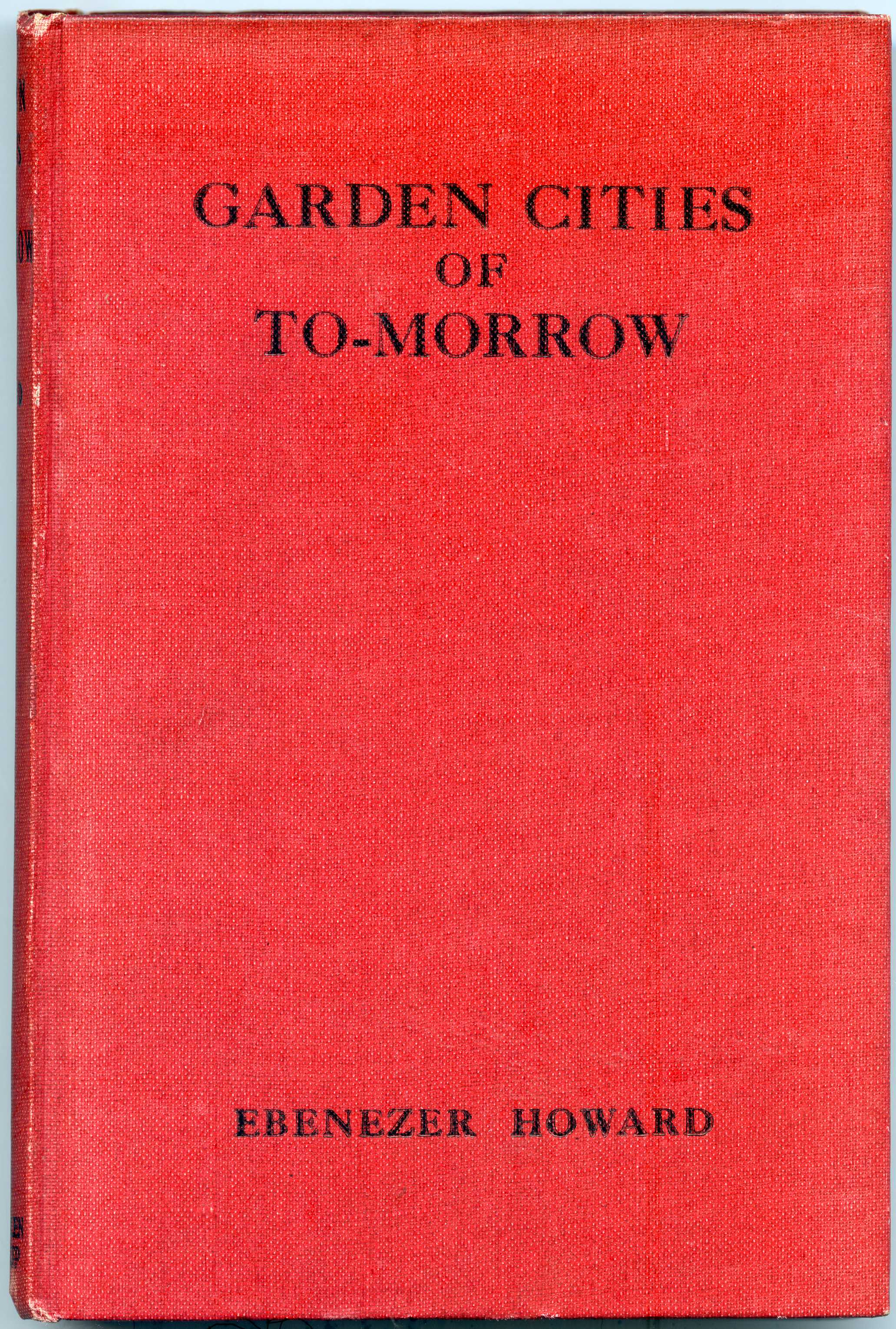
Ebenezer Howard, Garden Cities of To-morrow.

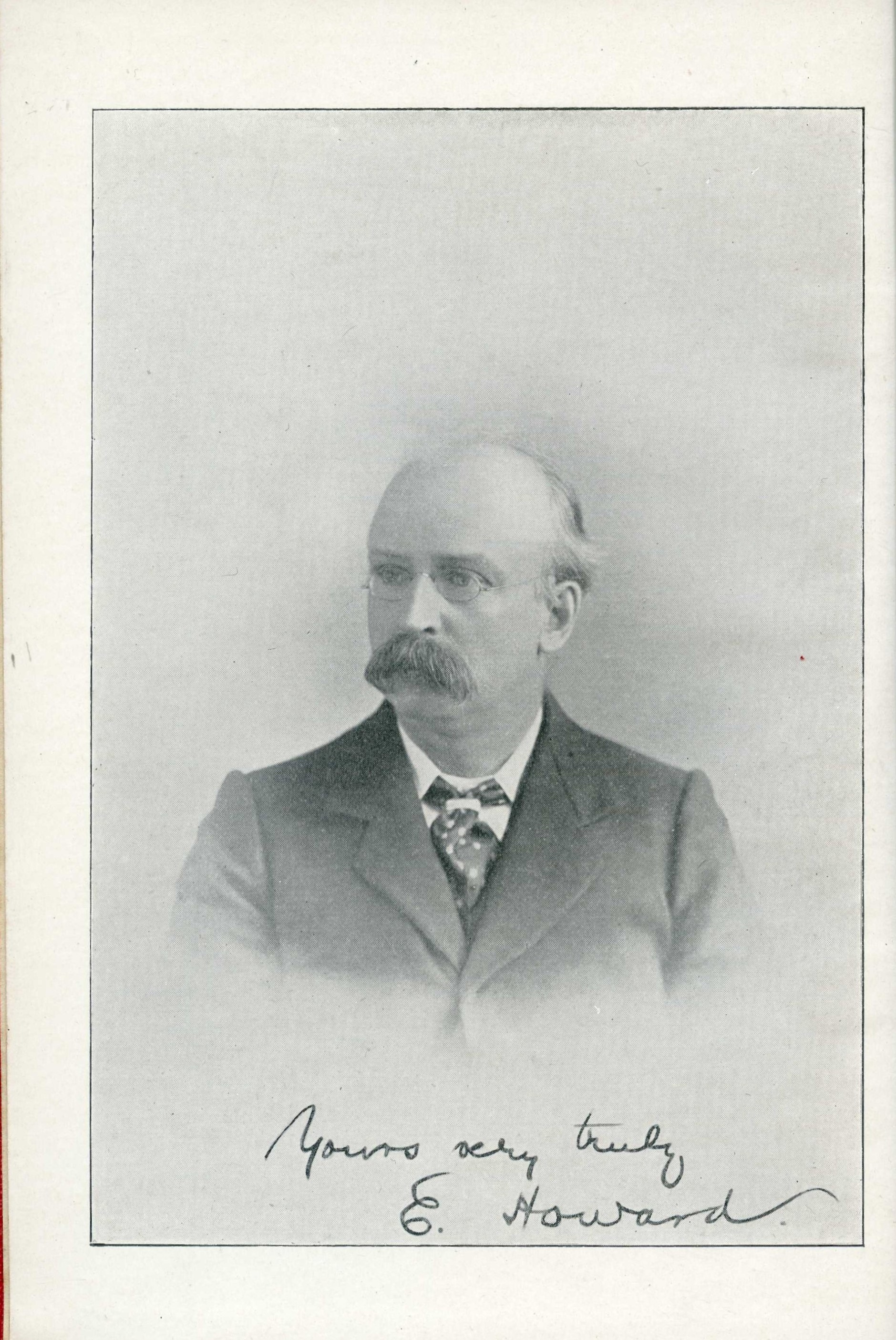
Ebenezer Howard, Garden Cities of To-morrow.

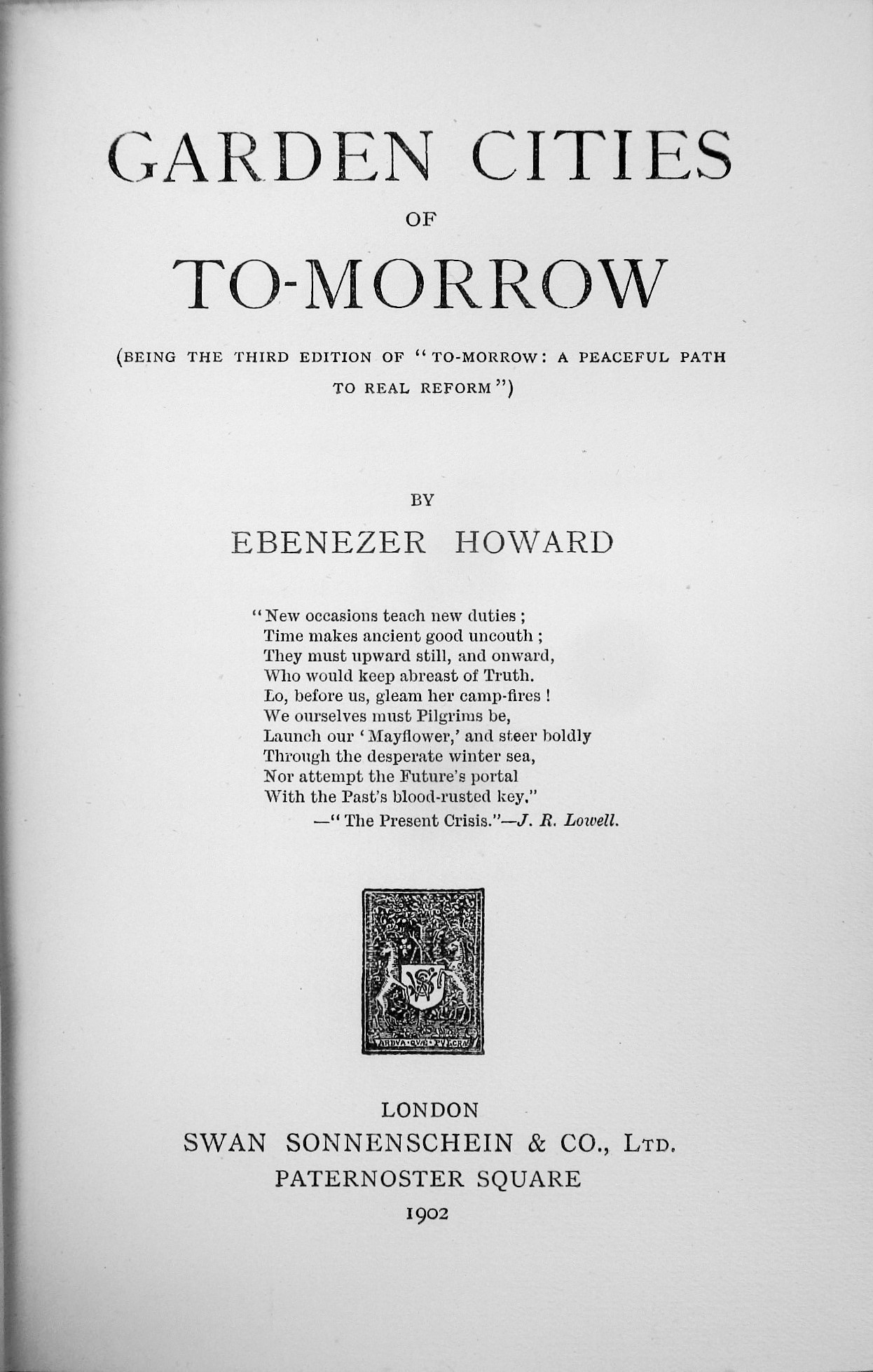
Ebenezer Howard, Garden Cities of To-morrow.

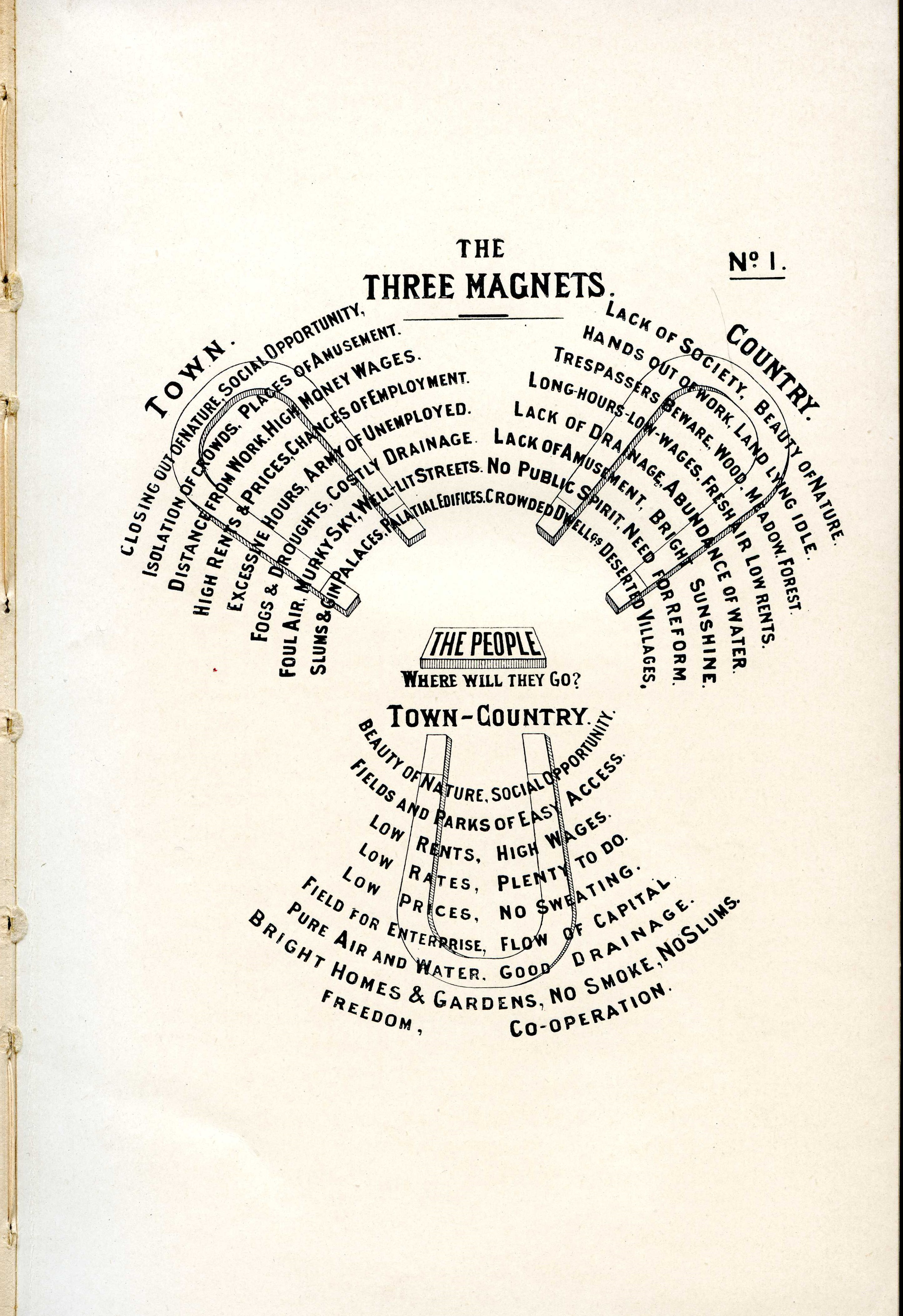
Diagram No.1 (Ebenezer Howard, Garden Cities of To-morrow.)

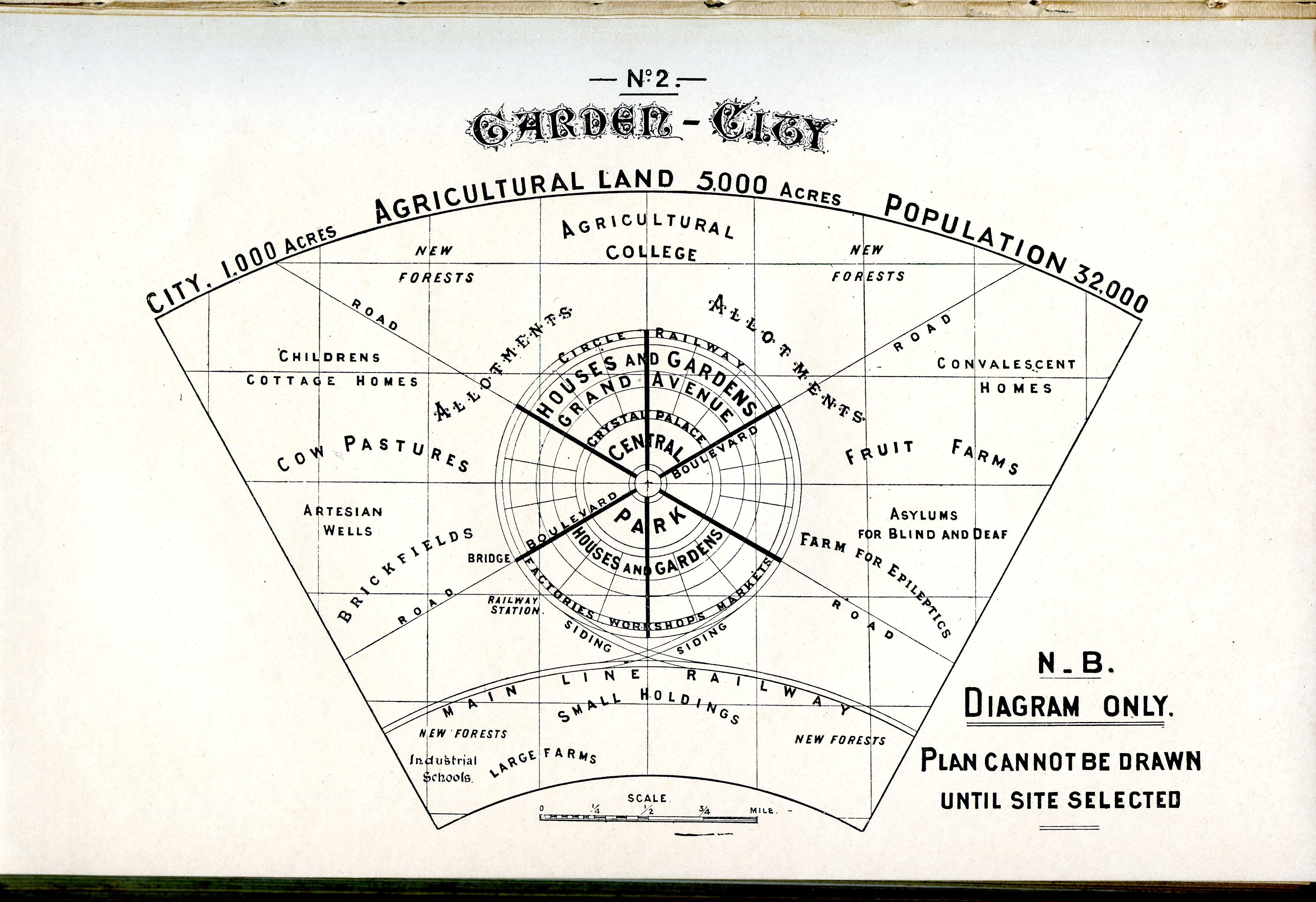
Diagram No.2 (Ebenezer Howard, Garden Cities of To-morrow.)

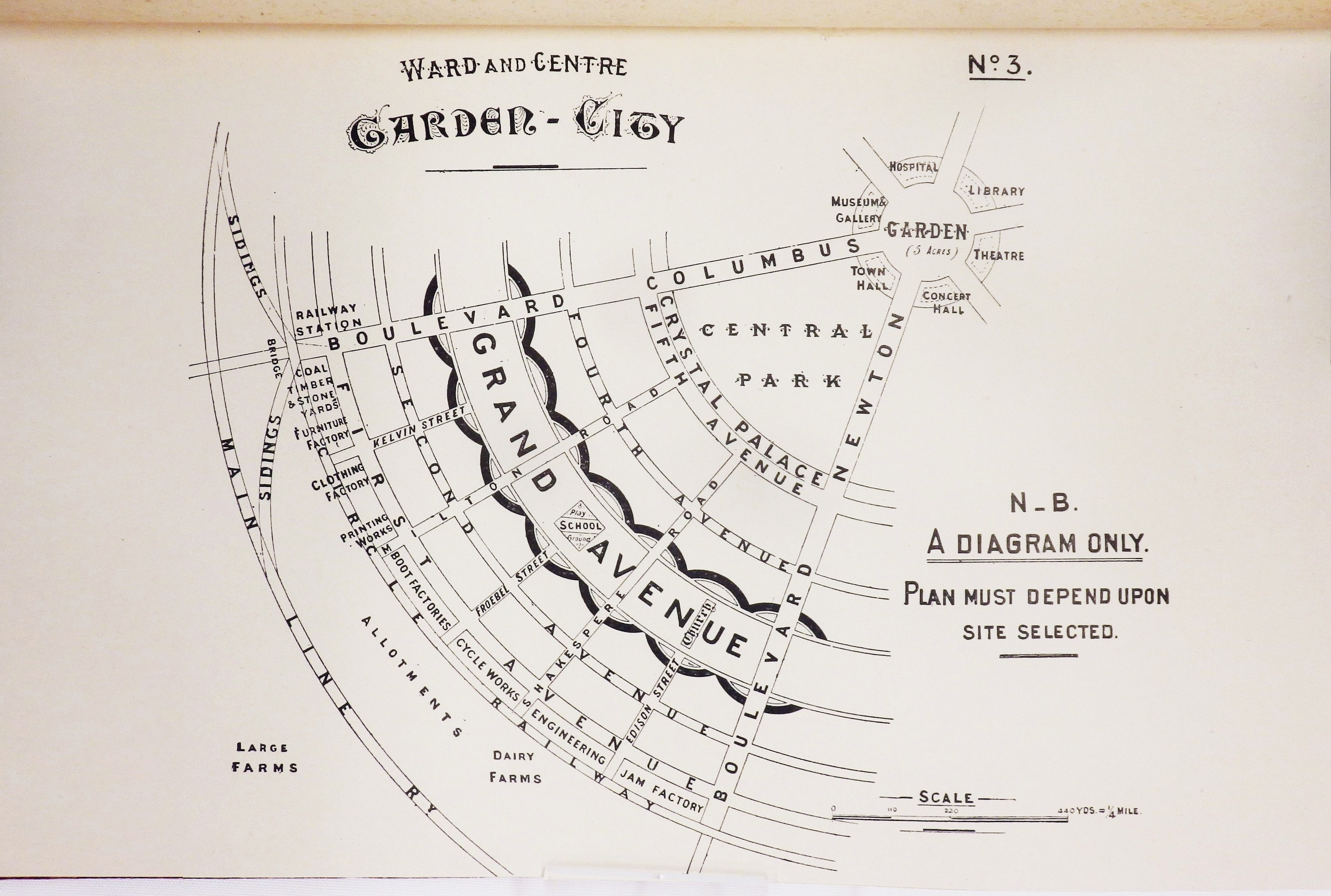
Diagram No.3 (Ebenezer Howard, Garden Cities of To-morrow.)

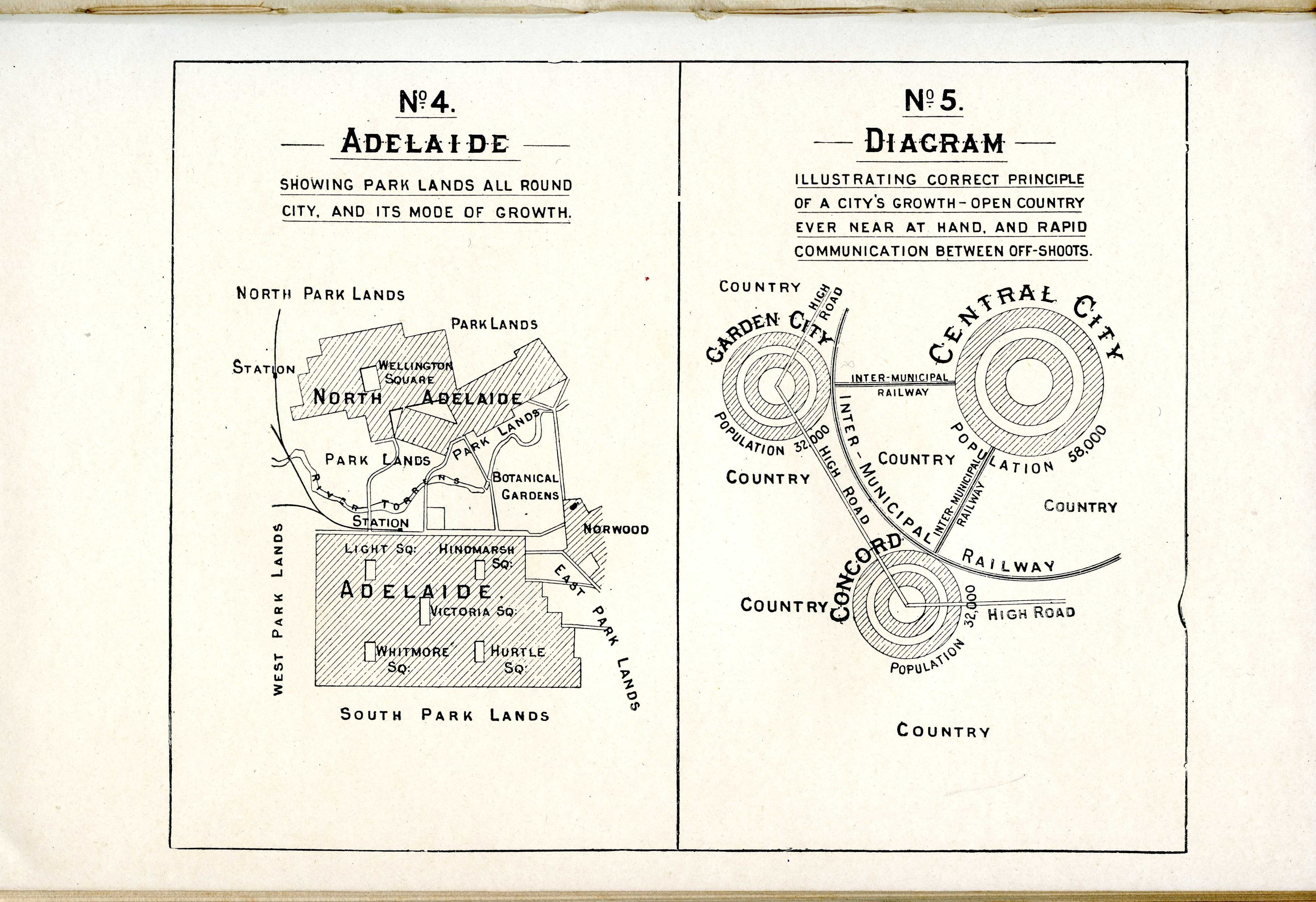
Diagram No.4 (Ebenezer Howard, Garden Cities of To-morrow.)
