= John Friedmann =

American city planner (1926–2017)

John Friedmann (April 16, 1926 – June 11, 2017) was an Honorary Professor in the School of Community and Regional Planning at the University of British Columbia in Vancouver, Canada, and Professor Emeritus at the UCLA Luskin School of Public Affairs. He was the founding professor of the Program for Urban Planning in the Graduate School of Architecture and Planning at UCLA and served as its head for a total of 14 years between 1969 and 1996.

== Life ==
He was born in Vienna, Austria. He obtained a PhD at the University of Chicago in 1955, and then, between 1955 and 1969, worked in Brazil, South Korea, the United States, Venezuela and Chile for academic, government and non-government agencies. In 1966 he developed the core-periphery four-stage model of regional development, explaining that "where economic growth is sustained over long time periods, its incidence works towards a progressive integration of the space economy." Nineteen years later, his article "The World City Hypothesis" generated a stream of research in economic geography, development studies, and planning. His 1987 book, Planning in the Public Domain: From Knowledge to Action, is widely used as a text in planning schools throughout the world.

In 1988, Friedmann received the Distinguished Planning Educator Award from the American Collegiate Schools of Planning. His achievements have been internationally recognized, with Honorary Doctorates from the Catholic University of Chile, the Technical University of Dortmund and York University in Toronto in 2016. In 2006, he was the first recipient of the UN-Habitat Lecture Award "for his outstanding and sustained contribution to research, thinking and practice in the field of Human Settlements." And in 2008, he was appointed Honorary Advisor to the China Academy of Urban Planning and Design.

Friedmann was married to Leonie Sandercock. He was widely regarded as among the most authoritative living planning writers on sustainable international development and planning theory.

== Publishings ==
His publishing record includes 17 sole-authored books, 11 co-edited books, and more than 150 chapters, articles, and reviews. Friedmann's research focused on processes of urbanization, particularly in China. His most recent books include The Prospect of Cities (2002), China's Urban Transition (2005), and Insurgencies: Essays in Planning Theory (2011). Many of his writings have been translated into various languages, including Japanese, Italian, Spanish, Portuguese, Persian, and Chinese.

== Death ==
Friedmann died at the age of 91 in Vancouver on June 11, 2017. He is survived by his daughter Manuela Friedmann and his first wife, Traudl.

== Selected publications ==
- (2011) Insurgencies: Essays in Planning Theory, London and New York: Routledge,(ISBN 978-0-415-78152-7 (pbk))
- (2005) China's Urban Transition, Minneapolis: University of Minnesota Press, (ISBN 0816646147 and ISBN 0816646155 (pbk))
- (2002) The Prospect of Cities, Minneapolis: University of Minnesota Press (ISBN 0816638845)
- (1992) Empowerment: The Politics of Alternative Development, Oxford: Blackwell Publishers (ISBN 1557863008 (pbk))
- (1987) Planning in the Public Domain: From Knowledge to Action, Princeton, NJ: Princeton University Press (ISBN 0691077436 and ISBN 0691022682 (pbk))
- (1973) Retracking America: A Theory of Transactive Planning, Anchor Press, (ISBN 978-0-385-00679-8 (pbk))
