= Paul Davidoff =

- Born: February 14, 1930; New York, New York, U.S.
- Died: December 27, 1984 (aged 54); New York, New York, U.S.
- Education: Allegheny College; University of Pennsylvania
- Occupations: Urban planner, professor
- Known for: Advocacy planning, inclusionary zoning
- Spouses: Mary "Rusty" Miller (m. 1952; died 1964) Linda Greenberg (m. 1964; died 2003)
- Children: Susan; Adam; Carla; Daniel; Thomas
- Website: pauldavidoff.com

Paul Davidoff (February 14, 1930 – December 27, 1984) was an American planner, planning educator, and planning theoretician who conceptualized "advocacy planning" with his wife, Linda Stone Davidoff. In legal scholarship, he is known as the primary litigant in the Mount Laurel decision, which established a state-constitutional basis for inclusionary zoning in New Jersey, a doctrine which has been accepted in other United States jurisdictions. Davidoff founded the Suburban Action Institute and the urban planning department at Hunter College, and also taught at the University of Pennsylvania and Princeton University during his career.

== Life and career ==
Davidoff was born in New York City on February 14, 1930 to Bernard and Mildred Davidoff. He completed an undergraduate degree at Allegheny College and started but did not complete a law degree at Yale Law School before enrolling at the University of Pennsylvania Graduate School of Fine Arts, where he graduated with a degree in city planning in 1956. While teaching there, he also received a law degree from the university in 1961. He married Mary "Rusty" Miller in 1952. They had three children, Susan, Adam and Carla. Adam and Mary were killed in a car crash in 1962. He and Linda Greenberg met in the 1960s while she was a planning student at Penn and were married in December, 1962. They had two sons, Daniel and Thomas.

Over his career he held positions with planning agencies and in academia in around New York City. He worked for several years as a planner in New Canaan, CT, and later for the prestigious architectural firm of Voorhees, Walker Smith & Smith. In 1964 he founded the department of urban studies at Hunter College in New York. In 1965 Davidoff wrote AIR journal article “Advocacy and pluralism in planning” where he argued for advocacy on behalf of poor communities, social planning and greater citizen involvement in the planning process.

Davidoff founded the Suburban Action Institute in 1969. It challenged exclusionary zoning in the courts, winning a notable success in the landmark Mount Laurel case (South Burlington County NAACP v. Mount Laurel Township, 92 N.J., 158). The litigation led to the requirement by the New Jersey Supreme Court (1983) for communities to supply their "regional fair share" of low-income housing needs, known as the "Mount Laurel Doctrine."

Davidoff died in New York City from complications related to cancer treatment on December 27, 1984.

== Advocacy planning ==
In 1964, Davidoff became a founding member the advocacy planning organization "Planners for Equal Opportunity."

== Memorials ==
The American Planning Association presents the Paul Davidoff National Award for Social Change and Diversity annually to a project, group, or individual that has assisted the disadvantaged.

The Association of Collegiate Schools of Planning has presented the Paul Davidoff Award every other year since 1985 to recognize "an outstanding book publication regarding participatory planning and positive social change, opposing poverty and racism as factors in society and seeking ways to address disparities across race, class, language, and gender." The 2013 award went to a book that dealt with Davidoff's own work on the Mt. Laurel Case: Climbing Mount Laurel by Douglas S. Massey, Len Albright, Rebecca Casciano, Elizabeth Derickson & David N. Kinsey.

== Bibliography ==
=== Journal articles ===
- Davidoff, Paul; Reiner, Thomas A. (1962). "A Choice Theory of Planning". Journal of the American Institute of Planners. 28 (2): 103–115. doi:10.1080/01944366208979427.
- Davidoff, Paul (1965). "Advocacy and Pluralism in Planning". Journal of the American Institute of Planners. 31 (4): 331–338. doi:10.1080/01944366508978187.
- Davidoff, Paul; Davidoff, Linda (1970). "Opening the Suburbs: Toward Inclusionary Land Use Controls". Syracuse Law Review. 22: 509–536.
- Davidoff, Paul; Davidoff, Linda; Gold, Neil Newton (1970). "Suburban Action: Advocate Planning For An Open Society". Journal of the American Institute of Planners. 36 (1): 12–21. doi:10.1080/01944367008977275.
- Davidoff, Paul (1975). "Working Toward Redistributive Justice". Journal of the American Institute of Planners. 41 (5): 317–318. doi:10.1080/01944367508977676.

=== Book chapters ===
- Davidoff, Paul (1968). "Normative Planning". In Anderson, Stanford (ed.). Planning for Diversity and Choice: Possible Futures and Their Relations to the Man-Controlled Environment. Cambridge: MIT Press. ISBN 978-1199550255.
- Davidoff, Paul; Brooks, Mary E. (1976). "Zoning out the Poor". In Dolce, P. (ed.). Suburbia: American Dream and Dilemma. Garden City, NY: Anchor. pp. 156–161.
- Davidoff, Paul; Davidoff, Linda (1978). "Advocacy in Urban Planning". In Weber, George H.; McCall, G. J. (eds.). Social Scientists As Advocates: Views From Applied Disciplines. Beverly Hills: SAGE. pp. 99–120.

=== Other publications ===
- Davidoff, Paul (1967). "Democratic Planning". Perspecta. Vol. 11. Yale School of Architecture. pp. 156–159.
- Davidoff, Linda; Davidoff, Paul; Gold, Neil N. (7 November 1971). "The Suburbs Have to Open Their Gates". The New York Times Magazine. pp. 39–42.
