= Index of urban planning articles =

Urban, city, or town planning is the discipline of planning which explores several aspects of the built and social environments of municipalities and communities:

== A ==
Ancient Chinese urban planning - American Institute of Certified Planners (AICP) - American Planning Association - Athens Charter

== B ==
Broadacre City

== C ==
Circles of Sustainability - Canadian Institute of Planners - Concentric zone model - Coving (urban planning) - Crime prevention through environmental design

== E ==
eGovernment - Environmental design - Environmental planning

== F ==
Floor Area Ratio - Filtering (housing)

== G ==
Garden city movement - Geographic information system (GIS) - Grid plan

== H ==
Healthy development measurement tool - Health impact of light rail - HUD USER - Hudson's village model

== I ==
International Society of City and Regional Planners

== J ==
Journal of Transport and Land Use

== K ==
- Killian Pretty Review

== L ==
Land use conflict - Land use planning - Landscape architecture - Linear city - List of planning journals

== M ==
Manhattanization - Manual for Streets (in the UK) - Metropolitan planning organization - MONU - magazine on urbanism

== N ==
New Pedestrianism - New town - New Urbanism

== O ==
Online land planning

== P ==
Pedestrian zone - Planetizen - Planning Institute Australia - Prague Institute - Principles of Intelligent Urbanism - Public open space

== R ==
Radical planning - Regional Planning - Regulatory Barriers Clearinghouse - Royal Town Planning Institute

== S ==
Setback - SimCity series - Smart growth - Spatial planning

== T ==
Terminating vista - Town and Country Planning Association - Town and Country Planning in the United Kingdom - Transferable development rights - Transit Oriented Development - Transportation Planning

== U ==
Unified settlement planning - Unitary urbanism - United States metropolitan area - Urban area - Urban design - Urban forest - Urban forestry - Urban Land Institute - Urban planning education - Urban planning in Africa - Urban planning in ancient Egypt - Urban planning in Australia - Urban planning in China - Urban planning in France - Urban planning in Japan - Urban planning in communist countries - Urban planning in the European Union - Urban planning in Shanghai - Urban planning in Singapore - Urban Planning Society of China - Urban plans in Iran - Urban reforestation - Urban renewal - Urban sprawl - Urban village - Urbanomics

== V ==
Vancouverism

== W ==
World Cities Summit - World's most livable cities

== Z ==
Zoning

== See also ==
- List of planned cities
- List of urban planners
- List of urban theorists
- List of urban studies topics
- MONU – magazine on urbanism
