= Outline of urban planning =

The following outline is provided as an overview of and topical guide to urban planning:

Urban planning – technical and political process that is focused on the development and design of land use and the built environment, including air, water, and the infrastructure passing into and out of urban areas, such as transportation, communications, and distribution networks and their accessibility.

Urban planning is also known as town planning, city planning, regional planning, or rural planning.

== Major ideas ==
- Urban area
- City
- Metropolitan area
- Suburb
- Land use
- Planning
- Planning and zoning commission
- Growth management

== Branches of planning ==
=== Physical and real estate ===
- Land-use planning
- Neighborhood planning
- Comprehensive planning (US)
- Spatial planning
- Urban design
- Redevelopment
- Regional planning
- Mixed-use development

=== Community and economic development ===
- Community economic development
- Community development planning

=== Environment ===
- Environmental planning
- Recreation resource planning
- Sustainable development
- Climate change adaptation
- Conservation development
- Low-impact development

=== Transportation ===
- Transportation planning
- Transit-oriented development
- Public transport planning

=== Preservation ===
- Historic preservation
- Preservation development

=== Research ===
- Urbanism

=== Other approaches ===
- Indigenous planning
- Online land planning
- Participatory planning
- Participatory GIS
- Technical aspects of urban planning
- Community engagement
- Participatory development
- People-centered development

== History and theory of planning ==
Theories of urban planning and history of urban planning

- Sanitary movement
- Garden city movement
- Back-to-the-land movement
- Linear city
- City Beautiful movement
- Soviet urban planning ideologies of the 1920s
- Towers in the park
- New towns movement
- Strategic urban planning
- Advocacy planning
- New Suburbanism
- Communicative planning
- Rational planning model

== Planning by region ==
- Planning cultures

=== Planning of Africa ===
- Urban planning in Africa
- Urbanization in Africa
- Urban planning in ancient Egypt

=== Planning of Asia ===
- Urban planning in China
  - Urban planning in Shanghai
  - Ancient Chinese urban planning
- Urban planning in Singapore
- Urban planning in Iran

=== Planning of Europe ===
- Town and country planning in the United Kingdom
  - Town and country planning in England
  - Town and country planning in Northern Ireland
  - Town and country planning in Scotland
  - Town and country planning in Wales
- Spatial planning in Serbia
- Urban planning in Spain
  - Urban planning of Barcelona
- Urban planning in the Czech Republic
- Urban planning in Nazi Germany
- Urban planning in communist countries
  - Soviet urban planning ideologies of the 1920s

=== Planning of North America ===
- Urban planning in the United States
  - Planning and development in Detroit

=== Planning of Oceania ===
- Urban planning in Australia
  - Urban planning in Sydney

== Planning education ==
- Urban planning education

== Awards for planning ==
- Danish Urban Planning Award
- Kevin Lynch Award

== Related fields ==
- Architecture
- Civil engineering
- Development economics
- Urban ecology
- Urban economics
- Geography
- Land development
- Landscape architecture
- Marine spatial planning
- Public health
- Public policy
- Real estate development
- Social sciences

== See also ==
- Terminology
- Outline of transport planning
- Outline of architecture
- Outline of geography
