= Index of urban studies articles =

Urban studies is the diverse range of disciplines and approaches to the study of all aspects of cities, their suburbs, and other urban areas. This includes among others: urban economics, urban planning, urban ecology, urban transportation systems, urban politics, sociology and urban social relations. This can be contrasted with the study of rural areas and rural lifestyles.

== A ==
- architecture
- arcology
- allotment (gardening)
- Automobile dependency
- autonomous building

== B ==
- Bat-Yam International Biennale of Landscape Urbanism
- Beijing Planning Exhibition Hall
- bicycle-friendly
- built environment

== C ==
- car-free zone
- car-pool lane
- Central business district
- city
- City limits
- community
- community currency
- community emergency response team
- commuting
- Council on Tall Buildings and Urban Habitat
- congestion charge
- consumerism
- co-housing
- cultural diversity

== E ==
- eco-industrial park
- eco-village
- ecological health
- ecological footprint
- ecological sanitation
- ecology
- economies of agglomeration
- education
- electricity generation
- energy
- environmental health
- environmental studies
- externality

== F ==
- farmers market
- flash mob

== G ==
- gentrification
- Global city
- Grand Paris

== H ==
- Hudson's village model
- human development theory

== I ==
- infrastructural capital
- industrial ecology

== J ==
- juvenile justice

== L ==
- land ethic
- landscape architecture
- Larger Urban Zones

== M ==
- mass transit
- Moscow Urban Forum
- Museums
- Music

== N ==
- neighborhood
- Neighbourhood character
- New Pedestrianism)
- New urbanism

== O ==
- Overcrowding

== P ==
- pedestrian-friendly
- pedestrian overpass
- pedestrian underpass
- personal rapid transit
- Place
- Place identity
- Placemaking
- Planetizen
- planned cities
- political economy
- productivism
- Public space
- public transport
- Principles of Intelligent Urbanism

== R ==
- Radical planning
- recycling
- redlining
- Regional planning
- rural

== S ==
- schools
- service economy
- seven-generation sustainability
- sewage system
- Shanghai Urban Planning Exhibition Center
- shared space
- shift-share
- smog
- Sociology
- soft energy
- street reclaiming
- suburban
- suburban colonization

== T ==
- traffic calming
- toll bridge
- toll road
- terrorism
- Times Square Red, Times Square Blue
- transit-oriented development

== U ==
- urbanization
- urban agriculture
- urban anthropology
- urban area
- urban car
- urban culture
- urban decay
- urban design
- urban ecology
- urban exploration
- Urban forest
- Urban forestry
- urban geography
- urban history
- Urban Land Institute
- urban outdoorsman
- urban planner
- urban planning
- Urban planning in ancient China
- Urban planning in ancient Egypt
- Urban planning in communist countries
- urban primacy
- Urban reforestation
- urban renewal
- urban secession
- urban sociology
- Urban space
- urban sprawl
- Urban Tourism
- urban tribe
- urban wilderness
- urbicide
- unemployment
- urbanomics

== V ==
- Violence

== W ==
- Welthauptstadt Germania
- white flight
- World Planners Congress

== Z ==
- zoning

== Related lists ==
- List of city squares
- List of city squares by size
- list of urban planning topics
- index of urban sociology articles
- list of planned cities
- list of urban planners
- list of ecology topics
- list of environment topics
- list of ethics topics
- list of economics topics
- list of architecture topics
- list of political science topics

== See also ==
- ABCD Region: An industrial region made up of seven municipalities with the greater metropolitan area of São Paulo, Brazil
