= List of urban theorists =

This is a list of urban theorists notable in their field, in alphabetical order:

- Christopher Alexander (1936-2022)
- Donald Appleyard (1928-1982)
- Michael E. Arth
- Christopher Charles Benninger (1942)
- Walter Block (1941)
- Ernest Burgess (1886-1966)
- Peter Calthorpe (1949)
- Manuel Castells (1942)
- Ildefons Cerdà (1815-1876)
- Gordon Cullen (1914-1994)
- Mike Davis (1946-2022)
- Constantinos Doxiadis (1914-1975)
- Andrés Duany (1949)
- Richard Florida
- John Friedmann
- Joel Garreau
- Patrick Geddes (1854-1932)
- Jan Gehl
- Paul Goodman
- Percival Goodman (1904-1989)
- Adam Greenfield
- Peter Hall (1932-2014)
- David Harvey
- Ebenezer Howard (1850-1928)
- Arata Isozaki
- Allan Jacobs (1928)
- Jane Jacobs (1916-2006)
- Kiyonori Kikutake (1928-2011)
- Rem Koolhaas (1944)
- Kisho Kurokawa (1934-2007)
- Fumihiko Maki
- James Howard Kunstler
- Le Corbusier (1887-1965)
- Loretta Lees
- Henri Lefebvre (1901-1991)
- Jiří Löw
- Kevin A. Lynch (1918-1984)
- Rob Krier (1938)
- Richard L. Meier (1920-2007)
- Lewis Mumford (1895-1990)
- Saverio Muratori (1910-1973)
- Clarence Perry (1872-1944)
- Elizabeth Plater-Zyberk
- Miguel Robles-Durán
- Witold Rybczynski
- Thomas Sieverts
- Camillo Sitte (1843-1903)
- Edward Soja (1940-2015)
- Ignasi de Solà-Morales (1942-2001)
- Kenzo Tange (1913-2005)
- Robert Venturi (1925-2018)
- William H. Whyte (1917-1999)
- Frank Lloyd Wright (1867-1959)
- Sharon Zukin (1946)

== See also ==
- Index of urban planning articles
- Index of urban studies articles
- List of urban planners
- List of landscape architects
- Landscape architect
- Landscape architecture
- Urban design
- Urban geography
- Urban economics
- Urban sociology
- Urban studies
- Urban theory
