= Bruce Appleyard =

American urban planner

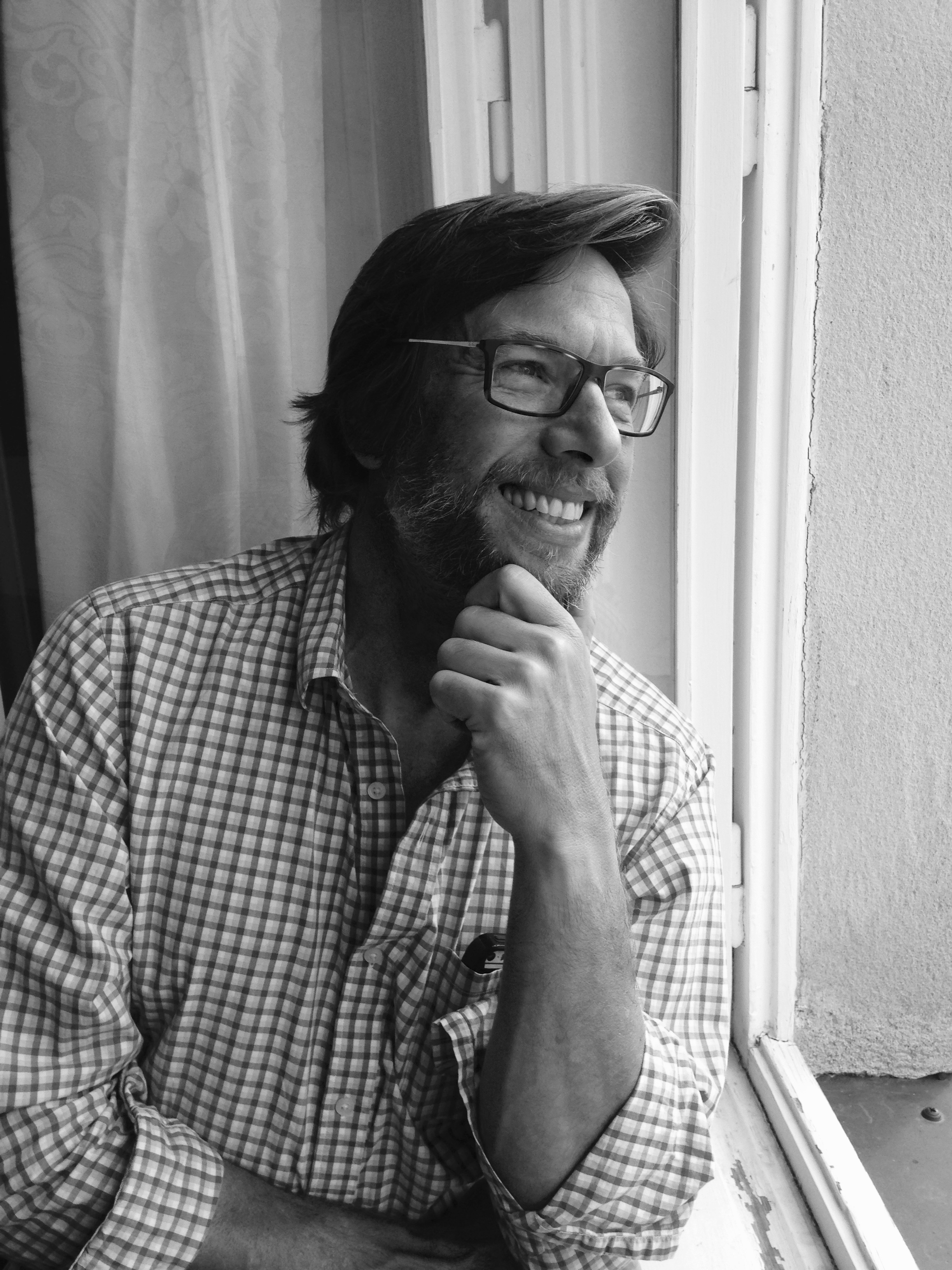
- Appleyard, Summer 2015
- Born: Bruce Sidney Appleyard; July 2, 1965 (age 60); Boston, Massachusetts, U.S.
- Education: BA 1989, PhD 2010 UC Berkeley
- Occupations: academic, city planner, urban theorist
- Employer: San Diego State University
- Parent(s): Donald Appleyard and Sheila Appleyard

Bruce Appleyard (born July 2, 1965) is an American city planner and urban designer, theorist, consultant, academic, and author. He is a Professor of City Planning for San Diego State University in the School of Public Affairs. He has authored articles in the emerging field of Livability Ethics. He is the son of Donald Appleyard, a British-born American urban and city planner.

== Education ==
Appleyard earned his Bachelor of Arts in geography from UC Berkeley in 1989, continuing to a Masters and PhD (2010) in City & Regional Planning, also from UC Berkeley. He joined the School of Public Affairs at San Diego State University (SDSU) in 2013, where he is currently a Professor.

== Career ==
At SDSU, Appleyard is the Director of Action Institute for Sustainability, Livability, and Equity (AISLE) and Active Transportation Research.

Appleyard has co-authored the textbook The Transportation/Land Use Connection and written scholarly articles on urban issues including transit-oriented development, land-use, sustainability, and livability.

In 2014, Appleyard and colleagues received a grant from HUD, DOT, and EPA to develop a "Livability Calculator" based on research from more than 350 transportation corridors throughout the United States. The Livability Calculator is a tool to help City Planning Professionals integrate the best planning practices of transport and land-use, access to opportunities, and social equity. Appleyard believes that by improving access to opportunities, people may improve the quality of their lives.

In 2020, he published Livable Streets 2.0, which updates and extends Donald Appleyard's 1981 study of urban design.

In 2023, in collaboration with researchers at the University of New Mexico, the University of California, Berkeley, the University of Wisconsin at Milwaukee, and the University of Tennessee, Appleyard was the recipient of a five-year $10 million grant from the US Department of Transportation to create the first University Transportation Center (UTC) dedicated solely to pedestrian and bicyclist safety.

== Awards ==
- 2006 Top-Ten Active Living Heroes by the Robert Wood Johnson Foundation, alongside Dan Burden and then-Senator Barack Obama. This was for work with communities to improve their livability, safety, and health.
