= Guangzhou Science City =

Area of Guangzhou, China

Guangzhou Science City (GSC; Chinese: 广州科学城; pinyin: Guǎngzhōu Kēxué Chéng) is a technology center developed with support from the Guangzhou government. It has emerged from the first-ever use of strategic urban planning in China. It integrates industrial, urban residential and commercial areas, forming one of the sub-urban centres within the polycentric metropolis of Guangzhou.

The Guangzhou municipal government continues to invest in the city and advocates R&D in IT sector and outsourcing industry.

== Location ==
GSC is located in the west of Huangpu District of Guangzhou, right above Guangzhou High-tech Industrial Development Zone.

== History ==
The reasons for the establishment of GSC go back all to way to the 1990s. During this time, China's political system became more decentralized, giving its cities more room to manoeuvre and engage in detailed decision making. Since local officials were evaluated on indicators such as economic growth, cities began to grow more competitive. Initiatives for developing urban centres explicitly designed as environments suitable to technology-intensive companies sprung up all over the country. Although the first national-level High-Tech Industrial Development Zone was started in Guangzhou in 1991, high-tech output remained insufficient throughout the 1990s. In an effort to draw in human capital and more advanced technologies, plans for the Guangzhou Science City were formally announced in the year 2000.

These plans for the GSC were part of the larger "Concept Plan" for Guangzhou. As the old modus operandi of urban master planning became increasingly unattractive and regarded as inefficient, strategic urban planning became the model of choice for the Guangzhou government. With its focus on spatial planning and city marketing, the approach appeared more suited to solve the challenges of rapid urban growth and inter-city competition.

Although the "Concept Plan" was announced in 2000, the idea for the GSC had been in the making much longer. First conceived by the municipal government in 1992, the State Scientific and Technological Commission only approved the project in 1995. While the first plan focused on mostly industrial areas, the second and third plans (1998 and 2000) emphasised the integration of living, commerce and business incubation areas. Construction began in 2000, but the municipal government adjusted the plan almost annually. In 2010, the emphasis had shifted mainly towards innovation and dynamic synergies between cluster members. Since then, the focus of the GSC has been on electronic information, biological, pharmaceutical and environmental industries.
