= Upmeyer =

Upmeyer is a surname. Notable people with the surname include:

- Bernd Upmeyer (born 1973), German architect
- Linda Upmeyer (born 1952), American politician
