= Urbanologist =

== See also ==
- Urban studies
