= Shift-share analysis =

Economics analysis

A shift-share analysis, used in regional science, political economy, and urban studies, determines what portions of regional economic growth or decline can be attributed to national, economic industry, and regional factors. The analysis helps identify industries where a regional economy has competitive advantages over the larger economy. A shift-share analysis takes the change over time of an economic variable, such as employment, within industries of a regional economy, and divides that change into various components. A traditional shift-share analysis splits regional changes into just three components, but other models have evolved that expand the decomposition into additional components.

== Overview ==
A shift-share analysis attempts to identify the sources of regional economic changes. The region can be a town, city, country, statistical area, state, or any other region of the country. The analysis examines changes in an economic variable, such as migration, a demographic statistic, firm growth, or firm formations, although employment is most commonly used. The shift-share analysis is performed on a set of economic industries, like those defined by the North American Industry Classification System (NAICS). The analysis separates the regional economic changes within each industry into different categories. Although there are different versions of a shift-share analysis, they all identify national, industry, and regional factors that influence the variable changes.

== Traditional model ==
The traditional form of the shift-share analysis was developed by Daniel Creamer in the early 1940s, and was later formalized by Edgar S. Dunn in 1960. Also known as the comparative static model, it examines changes in the economic variable between two years. Changes are calculated for each industry in the analysis, both regionally and nationally. Each regional change is decomposed into three components.

1. National growth effect is the portion of the change attributed to the total growth of the national economy. It equals the theoretical change in the regional variable had it increased by the same percentage as the national economy.
2. Industry mix effect is the portion of the change attributed to the performance of the specific economic industry. It equals the theoretical change in the regional variable had it increased by the same percentage as the industry nationwide, minus the national growth effect.
3. Local share effect is the portion of the change attributed to regional influences, and is the component of primary concern to regional analysts. It equals the actual change in the regional variable, minus the previous two effects.

=== Formula ===
The regional change in the variable e within industry i between the two years t and t+n is defined as the sum of the three shift-share effects: national growth effect (NS_{i}), industry mix effect (IM_{i}), and local share effect (RS_{i}).

$$e_i^{t+n} - e_i^t = NS_i + IM_i + RS_i$$

The beginning and ending values of the economic variable within a particular industry are e_{i}^{t} and e_{i}^{t+n}, respectively. Each of the three effects is defined as a percentage of the beginning value of the economic variable.

$$NS_i = e_i^t \times G$$

$$IM_i = e_i^t \times (G_i-G)$$

$$RS_i = e_i^t \times (g_i-G_i)$$

The total percent change in the economic variable nationwide for all industries combined is G, while the national and regional industry-specific percent changes are G_{i} and g_{i}, respectively.

These three equations substituted into the first equation yield the following expression (from where the decomposition starts), which simply says that the regional economic variable (for industry i) grows at the speed of the regional industry-specific percent change. Note that usually (in case of slow growth) 0 < g_{i} < 1 and that g_{i} refers to the whole period from t to t+n.

$$e_i^{t+n} = e_i^t \times (1+g_i)$$

=== Example ===
As an example, a shift-share analysis might be utilized to examine changes in the construction industry of a state's economy over the past decade, using employment as the economic variable studied. Total national employment may have increased 5% over the decade, while national construction employment increased 8%. However, state construction employment decreased 2%, from 100,000 to 98,000 employees, for a net loss of 2,000 employees.

The national growth effect is equal to the beginning 100,000 employees, times the total national growth rate of 5%, for an increase in 5,000 employees. The shift-share analysis implies that state construction would have increased by 5,000 employees, had it followed the same trend as the overall national economy.

The industry mix effect is equal to the original 100,000 employees times the growth in the industry nationwide, which was 8%, minus the total national growth of 5%. This results in an increase in 3,000 employees (100,000 employees times 3%, which is the 8% industry growth minus the 5% total growth). The analysis implies that the state construction would have increased by another 3,000 employees had it followed the industry trends, because the construction industry nationwide performed better than the national economy overall.

The local share effect in this example is equal to the beginning 100,000 employees times the state construction employment growth rate of −2% (it is negative because of the loss of employees), minus the national construction growth rate of 8%. This results in 100,000 employees times -10%, for a loss of 10,000 employees. However, the actual employment loss was only 2,000 employees, but that equals the sum of the three effects (5,000 gain + 3,000 gain + 10,000 loss). The analysis implies that local factors lead to a decrease in 10,000 employees in the state construction industry, because the growth in both the national economy and the construction industry should have increased state construction employment by 8,000 employees (the 5,000 national share effect plus the 3,000 industry mix effect).

=== Names and regions ===
Shift-share analysts sometimes use different labels for the three effects, although the calculations are the same. National growth effect may be referred to as national share. Industry mix effect may be referred to as proportional shift. Local share effect may be referred to as differential shift, regional shift, or competitive share.

In most shift-share analyses, the regional economy is compared to the national economy. However, the techniques may be used to compare any two regions (e.g., comparing a county to its state).

== Dynamic model ==
In 1988, Richard Barff and Prentice Knight, III, published the dynamic model shift-share analysis. In contrast to the comparative static model, which only considers two years in its analysis (the beginning and ending years), the dynamic model utilizes every year in the study period. Although it requires much more data to perform the calculations, the dynamic model takes into account continuous changes in the three shift-share effects, so the results are less affected by the choice of starting and ending years. The dynamic model is most useful when there are large differences between regional and national growth rates, or large changes in the regional industrial mix.

The dynamic model uses the same techniques as the comparative static model, including the same three shift-share effects. However, in the dynamic model, a time-series of traditional shift-share calculations are performed, comparing each year to the previous year. The annual shift-share effects are then totaled together for the entire study period, resulting in the dynamic model's shift-share effects.

=== Formula ===
The regional change in the variable e within industry i between the two years t and t+n is defined as the sum of the three shift-share effects: national growth effect (NS_{i}), industry mix effect (IM_{i}), and local share effect (RS_{i}).

$$e_i^{t+n} - e_i^t = NS_i + IM_i + RS_i$$

If the study period ranges from year t to year t+n, then traditional shift-share effects are calculated for every year k, where k spans from t+1 to t+n. The dynamic model shift-share effects are then calculated as the sum of the annual effects.

$$NS_i = \sum_{k=t+1}^{t+n} \left[ e_i^{k-1} \left( G^k \right) \right]$$

$$IM_i = \sum_{k=t+1}^{t+n} \left[ e_i^{k-1} \left( G_i^k - G^k \right) \right]$$

$$RS_i = \sum_{k=t+1}^{t+n} \left[ e_i^{k-1} \left( g_i^k - G_i^k \right) \right]$$

The growth rates used in the calculations are annual rates, not growth from the beginning year in the study period, so the percent change from year k-1 to k in the economic variable nationwide for all industries combined is G^{k}, while the national and regional industry-specific percent changes are G_{i}^{k} and g_{i}^{k}, respectively.

== Esteban-Marquillas Model ==
In 1972, J.M. Esteban-Marquillas extended the traditional model to address criticism that the regional share effect is correlated to the regional industrial mix. In the Esteban-Marquillas model, the regional share effect itself is decomposed into two components, isolating a regional shift component that is not correlated to the industrial mix. The model introduced a then-new concept to shift-share analyses, a homothetic level of the economic variable within an industry. This is the theoretical value of the variable within an industry assuming the region has the same industrial mix as the nation.

In the Esteban-Marquillas model, the calculations of the national share and industrial mix effects are unchanged. However, the regional share effect in the traditional model is separated into two effects: a new regional share effect that is not dependent on the industrial mix, and an allocation effect that is. The allocation effect indicates the extent to which the region is specialized in those industries where it enjoys a competitive advantage.

=== Formula ===
The regional change in the variable e within industry i between the two years t and t+n is defined as the sum of the four shift-share effects: national growth effect (NS_{i}), industry mix effect (IM_{i}), regional share effect (RS_{i}), and allocation effect (AL_{i}).

$$e_i^{t+n} - e_i^t = NS_i + IM_i + RS_i + AL_i$$

The beginning and ending values of the economic variable within a particular industry are e_{i}^{t} and e_{i}^{t+n}, respectively. The beginning value of the regional homothetic variable within a particular industry is h_{i}^{t}. It is based on the regional and national values of the economic variable across all industries, e^{t} and E^{t} respectively, and the industry-specific national value E_{i}^{t}.

$$h_i^t = e^t \times { E_i^t \over E^t }$$

Each of the four shift-share effects is defined as a percentage of either the beginning value of the economic variable, the homothetic variable, or the difference of the two.

$$NS_i = e_i^t \left( G \right)$$

$$IM_i = e_i^t \left( G_i-G \right)$$

$$RS_i = h_i^t \left( g_i-G_i \right)$$

$$AL_i = \left( e_i^t-h_i^t \right) \left( g_i-G_i \right)$$

The total percent change in the economic variable nationwide for all industries combined is G, while the national and regional industry-specific percent changes are G_{i} and g_{i}, respectively.

== Arcelus Model ==
In 1984, Francisco Arcelus built upon Esteban-Marquillas' use of the homothetic variables and extended the traditional model even further. He used this method to decompose the national share and industrial mix effects into expected and differential components. The expected component is based on the homothetic level of the variable, and is the effect not attributed to the regional specializations. The differential component is the remaining effect, which is attributable to the regional industrial mix.

Arcelus claimed that, even with the Esteban-Marquillas extension, the regional share effect is still related to the regional industry mix, and that the static model assumes all regional industries operate on a national market basis, focusing too heavily on the export markets and ignoring the local markets. In order to address these issues, Arcelus used a different method for separating the regional share effect, resulting in a regional growth effect and a regional industry mix effect. Both of these are decomposed into expected and differential components using the homothetic variable.

=== Formula ===
The regional change in the variable e within industry i between the two years t and t+n is defined as the sum of the eight shift-share effects: expected national growth effect (NSE_{i}), differential national growth effect (NSD_{i}), expected industry mix effect (IME_{i}), differential industry mix effect (IMD_{i}), expected regional growth effect (RGE_{i}), differential regional growth effect (RGD_{i}), expected regional industry mix effect (RIE_{i}), and differential regional industry mix effect (RID_{i}).

$$e_i^{t+n} - e_i^t = NSE_i + NSD_i + IME_i + IMD_i + RGE_i + RGD_i + RIE_i + RID_i$$

The eight effects are related to the three traditional shift-share effects from the comparative static model.

$$NS_i = NSE_i + NSD_i$$

$$IM_i = IME_i + IMD_i$$

$$RS_i = RGE_i + RGD_i + RIE_i + RID_i$$

The homothetic variable is calculated the same as in the Esteban-Marquillas model. The beginning value of the regional homothetic variable within a particular industry is h_{i}^{t}. It is based on the regional and national values of the economic variable across all industries, e^{t} and E^{t} respectively, and the industry-specific national value E_{i}^{t}.

$$h_i^t = e^t \times { E_i^t \over E^t }$$

Each of the eight shift-share effects is defined as a percentage of either the beginning value of the economic variable, the homothetic variable, or the difference of the two.

$$NSE_i = h_i^t \times G$$

$$NSD_i = \left( e_i^t - h_i^t \right) \times G$$

$$IME_i = h_i^t \times \left( G_i - G \right)$$

$$IMD_i = \left( e_i^t - h_i^t \right) \times \left( G_i - G \right)$$

$$RGE_i = h_i^t \times \left( g - G \right)$$

$$RGD_i = \left( e_i^t - h_i^t \right) \times \left( g - G \right)$$

$$RIE_i = h_i^t \times \left( g_i - g - G_i + G \right)$$

$$RID_i = \left( e_i^t - h_i^t \right) \times \left( g_i - g - G_i + G \right)$$

The total percent changes in the economic variable nationally and regionally for all industries combined are G and g respectively, while the national and regional industry-specific percent changes are G_{i} and g_{i}, respectively.
