= Bernd Upmeyer =

German architect

Bernd Upmeyer (born July 2, 1973) is a German architect and urbanist living and working in Rotterdam, where he opened his own architecture firm Bureau of Architecture, Research, and Design (BOARD) in 2005. He holds a Ph.D. in Urban Studies from the University of Kassel.

Upmeyer is the author of the book Binational Urbanism – On the Road to Paradise. In the book Upmeyer creates a theory of binational urbanism, a term coined by him. Binational Urbanism examines the way of life of people who start a second life in a second city in a second nation-state, without saying goodbye to their first city.

== Life ==
Born in Göttingen, Upmeyer studied architecture and urban design at the University of Kassel and at the Delft University of Technology.

Upmeyer is the great-grandson of the German musician and musicologist Walter Upmeyer and the grandson of the architect and Government Building Assessor Dietrich Upmeyer. His great aunt was the dancer and choreographer Almut Winckelmann (née Upmeyer) and his great-great-grandmother was the Dutch Dina Maria Gompertz, who was born in Rotterdam in 1857.

== MONU Magazine ==
Upmeyer is the founder and the editor-in-chief of the English-language magazine on urbanism MONU.

== Atelier International Grand Paris (AIGP) ==
From 2012 until 2016 Upmeyer and his office BOARD were part of the group, led by the architecture firm STAR strategies + architecture, that has been chosen as one of the new six teams of architects and urban planners appointed by the Atelier International Grand Paris (AIGP) to be part of the Scientific Committee for the mission: Grand Paris: pour une métropole durable.

== Bibliography ==
- Binational Urbanism – On the Road to Paradise (2015)
