= Bureau of Architecture, Research, and Design =

Architecture firm based in Rotterdam

The Bureau of Architecture, Research, and Design (BOARD) is an architecture firm based in Rotterdam that was founded in 2005 by German architect Bernd Upmeyer. The office is most known for producing the English-language magazine on urbanism MONU. From 2012 until 2016 BOARD was part of the group, led by the architecture firm STAR strategies + architecture, that has been chosen as one of the new six teams of architects and urban planners appointed by the Atelier International Grand Paris (AIGP) to be part of the Scientific Committee for the mission: Grand Paris: pour une métropole durable.

In 2019, BOARD won the first prize in the urban realization contest "Renovation area of railway areas North" for a 3-hectare plot in Quakenbrück. The project will create around 200 new residential units for the city.
