= Town and country planning in Northern Ireland =

Urban planning in England

Town and country planning in Northern Ireland is the land-use planning which applies to Northern Ireland. Planning policy is devolved in the United Kingdom, with policy for Northern Ireland under the overall control of the Northern Ireland Assembly. The principal piece of legislation is the Planning Act (Northern Ireland) 2011.

== Background ==
Until devolution took place after 1997, the planning system in the United Kingdom was unitary. It was separately legislated by the UK Government for England and Wales, Scotland and Northern Ireland, but with only subtle differences.

The Northern Ireland Assembly and devolved governments in Wales and Scotland provided the potential for the systems to diverge, but it was not until after 2011 that the devolved systems started to noticeably diverge from England.

== National government policies ==
=== Decision-making ===
Historically, in Northern Ireland, planning was a responsibility of the Department of Environment, with local government having no responsibilities at all. In 2015, planning became a responsibility of local authorities under the Planning (Northern Ireland) Act 2011. This had been first announced in 2007.

=== Regional Development Strategy ===
The Good Friday Agreement included a requirement for the publication of a Regional Development Strategy. The Secretary of State for Northern Ireland, Mo Mowlam, launched the first consultation for this in June 1997.

=== Strategic Planning Policy Statement ===
The Strategic Planning Policy Statement sets out the policies of the Department of Infrastructure, and local authorities are required to comply with it when developing their own community plans. The first version of it consolidated more than 20 planning documents into one.

== Local authority policies ==
=== Community plans ===
Local authorities set out their policies under community plans.

Community plans became a responsibility for local authorities from 1 April 2015.
