= Donald Appleyard =

English-American urban designer and theorist

- Donald Appleyard
- Born: July 26, 1928; London, England
- Died: September 23, 1982 (aged 54); Athens, Greece
- Education: MIT
- Occupations: academic, author, City Planning Urban theorist
- Employer(s): MIT, UC Berkeley
- Notable work: Livable Streets
- Spouse: Sheila Appleyard
- Children: 4, including Bruce Appleyard

Donald Sidney Appleyard (July 26, 1928 – September 23, 1982) was an English-American urban designer and theorist, teaching at the University of California, Berkeley.

Born in England, Appleyard studied first architecture, and later urban planning at the Massachusetts Institute of Technology. After graduation, he taught at MIT for six years, and later at the University of California, Berkeley. He worked on neighbourhood design in Berkeley and Athens and citywide planning in San Francisco and Ciudad Guayana. Appleyard gave lectures at over forty universities and acted in a professional capacity in architecture and planning firms in the United Kingdom, Italy and the United States. He died in Athens as a consequence of a traffic collision.

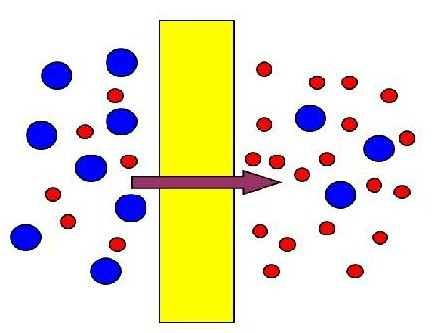
Membrane diagram resembling high traffic street

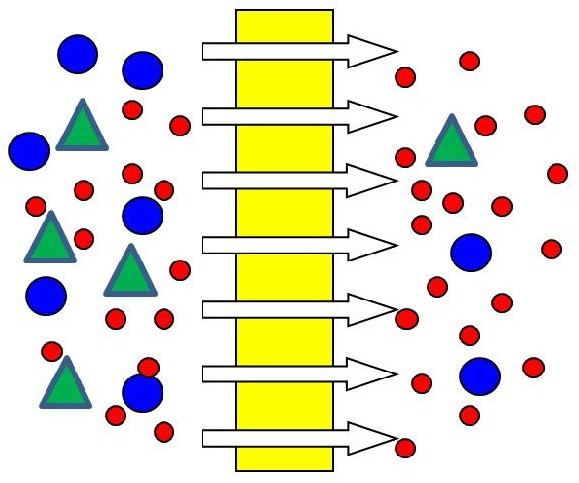
Membrane diagram resembling low traffic street

His 1981 book Livable Streets was described at the time by Grady Clay, the editor of the Landscape Architecture magazine, as "the most thorough and detailed work on urban streets to date". It contained a comparison of three streets of similar morphology in San Francisco, which had different levels of car traffic: one with 2,000 vehicles per day, the others with 8,000 respectively 16,000 vehicles per day. His research showed that residents of the street with low car traffic volume had twice as many acquaintances as the people living on the street with high car traffic.

Appleyard is co-author with Allan Jacobs of the paper "Toward an Urban Design Manifesto".

In 2009, he was named number 57 of Planetizen's Top 100 Thinkers of all time.

== Publications ==
- The View from the Road, Cambridge, MA: MIT Press, 1964. ISBN 0262010151
- Planning a Pluralistic City, Cambridge, MA: MIT Press, 1967.
- The Conservation of European Cities, Cambridge, MA: MIT Press, 1979.
- Livable Streets, University of California Press, Berkeley, 1981
- Toward an Urban Design Manifesto, Allan Jacobs and Donald Appleyard. Working Paper published 1982; republished with a prologue in the Journal of the American Planning Association, 1987.
