= Bart Lootsma =

Dutch author

Bart Lootsma (born 1957 in Amsterdam, Netherlands) studied architecture at the Eindhoven University of Technology during 1975–1984. He is a historian, critic, and curator in the fields of architecture, design, and fine arts. He holds the chair for architectural theory at the Leopold-Franzens University of Innsbruck and is also professor at the Institute for History, Theory and Critic in Architecture at the Academy of Applied Arts in Vienna.

As head of research, Lootsma worked at the ETH Zurich and led research projects at the Berlage Institute in Amsterdam and Rotterdam. He has also been appointed visiting professor at the Academy of Fine Arts Nuremberg and at the University of Applied Arts in Vienna. Additionally, he was director of the Department for 3D-Design at the Arnhem Academy of Art and Design.

Lootsma also taught several courses in architecture, design, and fine arts at different academies of Art and Architecture in the Netherlands. He was editor for numerous journals such as Forum, ARCHIS, de Architect, and GAM and has acted as guest curator for ArchiLab 2004 in Orléans The Naked City and curator at the Schneider-Forberg Foundation in Munich. Lootsma’s work has appeared in many journals, such as DOMUS, Archplus, l'Architecture d'Aujourd'hui and A+U.

Moreover, he was member of several state and municipal committees, such as the Planning Board Arnhem and served on the Rotterdam Cultural Council and the Fund for Applied Arts, Design, and Architecture. Previously, the Dutch Queen appointed him Crown Member of the Dutch Culture Council.

The work of Bart Lootsma has been released in many publications, including Media and Architecture in collaboration with Dich Rijken (1998), his internationally known book SuperDutch (2002), mostly dealing with Dutch Architecture, and ArchiLab 2004: The Naked City, which was widely published in 2004.

== Books ==
- Adriaan Geuze/West 8 Landscape Architects, (together with Inge Breugem), 010, Rotterdam, 1995.
- Wim Cuyvers, De Singel, Antwerp, 1995.
- Wiel Arets, A virological architecture, Birkhäuser Verlag, Basel (together with Jos Bosman), 1996.
- Wiel Arets, De Singel, Antwerpen, 1996.
- A Star is born, Together with Hélène Damen, Thoth, Bussum, 1996.
- Atelier van Lieshout, A Manual/ Ein Handbuch, Cantz, München (Together with ao. Rian van Rijsbergen), 1997.
- Yearbook Architecture in the Netherlands 1997, (Together with: Hans Ibelings, Hans van Dijk, Ton Verstegen), Nai Publishers, Rotterdam, 1998.
- Media and Architecture, (together with Dick Rijken), VPRO, Hilversum/Berlage Institute, Amsterdam, 1998.
- The Art of the Accident, (together with ao. Joke Brouwer, Nai Publishers, Rotterdam, 1998.
- Yearbook Architecture in The Netherlands 1998, (with Hans Ibelings, Hans van Dijk and Ton Verstegen), Nai Publishers, Rotterdam, 1999.
- Yearbook Architecture in the Netherlands 1999, (with: Hans Ibelings and Ton Verstegen), Nai Publishers, Rotterdam, 2000.
- SuperDutch, Thames & Hudson, London/Princeton Architectural Press, New York/DVA, Berlijn, SUN, Nijmegen, 2000.
- B&K+, Walter König Verlag/ACTAR, Cologne/Barcelona, 2003.
- ArchiLab 2004: La ville à nu/The naked city, HYX, Orléans, 2004.
