= Killian Pretty Review =

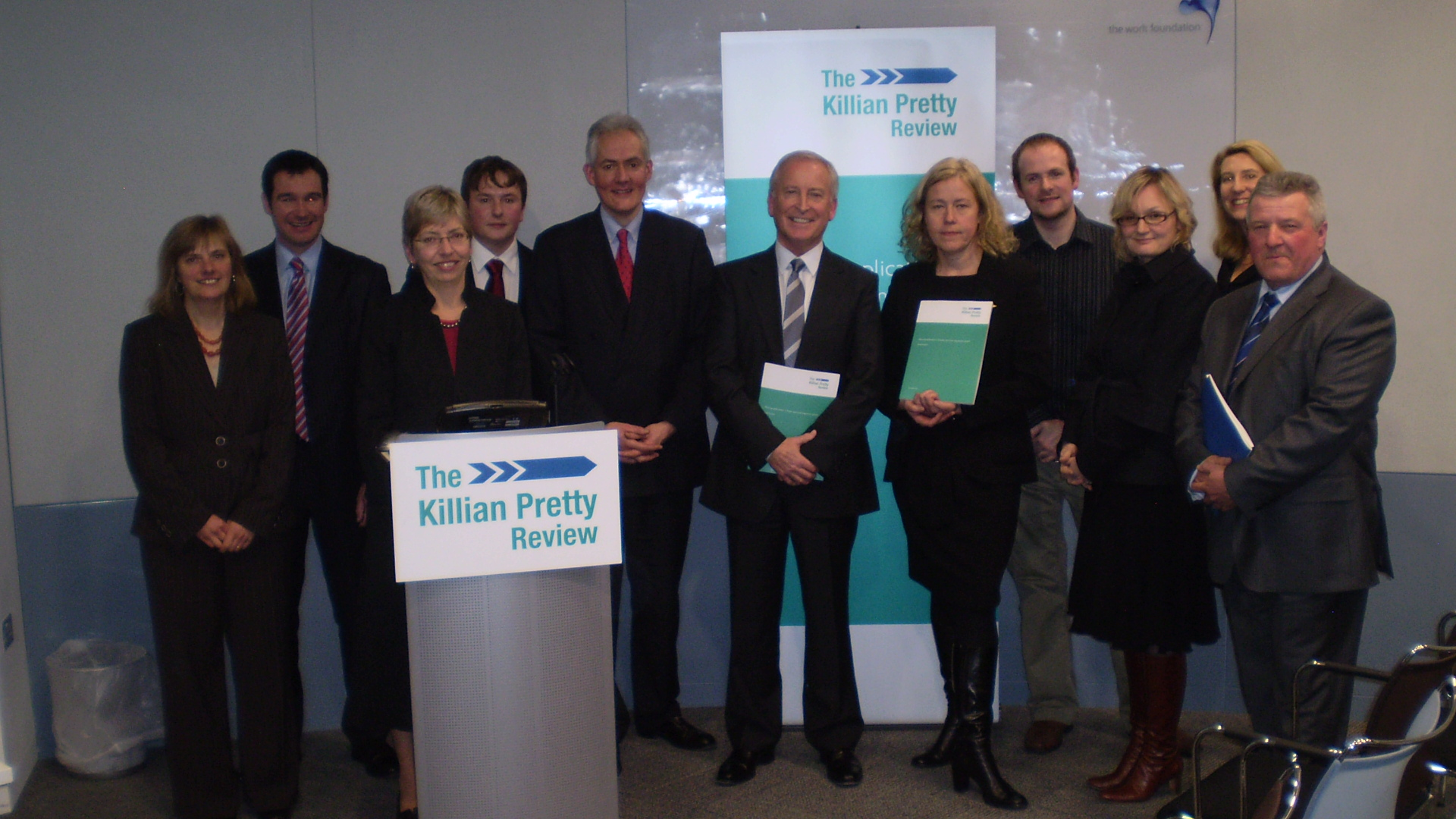

The Killian Pretty Review was an independent review of the planning application system in England, commissioned in March 2008 by Hazel Blears MP, Secretary of State for Communities and Local Government and John Hutton MP, former Secretary of State for Business, Enterprise and Regulatory Reform. The review was led by Joanna Killian (CEO of Essex County Council and Brentwood Borough Council) and David Pretty CBE (retired former CEO of Barratt Developments Ltd.)

The Terms of Reference for the Review were: "To consider how, within the context of the Government's objectives for the planning system and building on the reforms already announced, the planning application process can be improved for the benefit for all involved."

In June 2008 Killian and Pretty published their interim document, A Call for Solutions, asking stakeholders for ideas and solutions to the 17 questions laid out in the document.

The Final Report was published on 24 November 2008 and was launched by Hazel Blears MP and Margaret Beckett, Minister of State for Housing and Planning, at the Work Foundation.
