= MONU (magazine) =

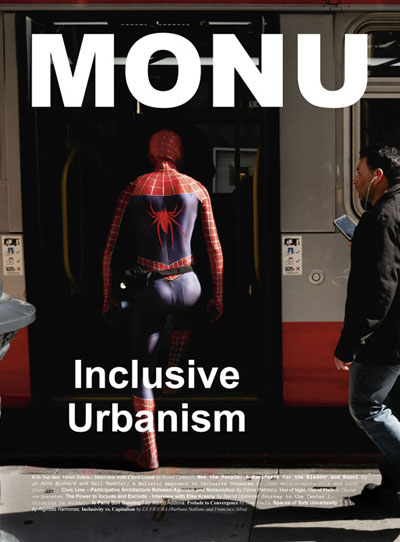
- Type: Annual magazine
- Format: Magazine
- Editor: Bernd Upmeyer
- Founded: June 2004
- Headquarters: Rotterdam; Netherlands
- Circulation: 3,000 copies per issue
- Website: monu-magazine.com

MONU is an English-language, annual magazine on urbanism that focuses on the city in a broad sense, including its politics, economy, geography, ecology, its social aspects, as well as its physical structure and architecture. Therefore, architecture is one of many fields covered by the magazine - fields which are all brought together under the catch-all term "urbanism". MONU is edited in the city of Rotterdam, Netherlands. Continuous publication began in June 2004. It refers to itself as an independent, non-conformist, niche publication that collects critical articles, images, concepts, and urban theories from architects, urbanists and theorists from around the world on a given topic.

MONU claims to examine topics that are important to the future of our cities and urban regions from a variety of perspectives and to provide a platform for comparative analysis. The different viewpoints, contexts, and methods of analysis allow for an in-depth exploration of various topics. The combination of writings and projects created within different cultures and from different professional backgrounds generates new insights into the complex phenomena connected to cities. The magazine functions as a platform for the exchange of ideas and thus constitutes a collective intelligence on urbanism.

== Mission statement ==
What MONU has been aiming at since the very beginning is exploring every kind of urban aspect, everything that appears around the city. The magazine was always intrigued to find out the hidden political, social and economic truths, formal realities and interdependencies in cities.

== Opinions ==
MONU is generally critical of the fact that often urban spaces only fulfill the wishes and dreams of a powerful minority, who neglect the needs of most other people. MONU criticizes the consequences of a financially powerful elite developing real estate projects in cities merely to accommodate their consumerist desires. (#12 in 2010)

The magazine also dismisses the lack of interest among architects and urban designers in dealing with the enormous potential of the existing urban material and topics such as urban and architectural restoration, preservation, renovation, redevelopment, renewal or adaptive reuse of old structures as socially irresponsible and economically and culturally unacceptable. (#14 in 2011)

MONU disapproves of the non-ideological - or better post-ideological - conditions of our society when it comes to cities and aims for a new sincerity that is needed in a world consisting of a multiplicity of choices and urban outcomes without a single consistent urban ideology. (#15 in 2011)

== History ==
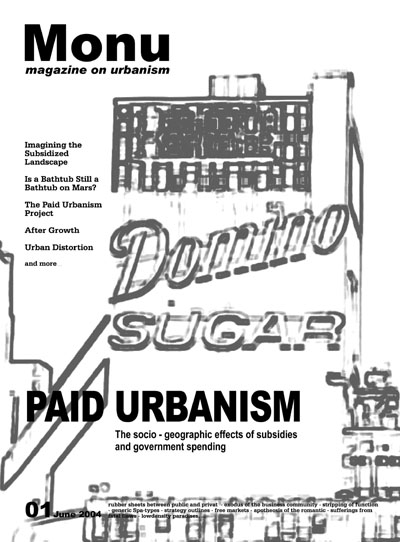
Cover of MONU's first issue on the topic of Paid Urbanism, on 16 June 2004

MONU was founded by Bernd Upmeyer and Thomas Söhl in 2004 and was originally conceived as a way to keep in touch and to continue to intellectually challenge one another after graduating in architecture and urban design at the University of Kassel in 2002. Both founders went their separate ways, however: Upmeyer started working in the Netherlands and Söhl moved to the United States.

The title of the magazine was created as an acronym: Magazine ON Urbanism. Upmeyer once explained in an interview that at the start of the new millennium it felt much more appropriate, in a globalized world, to investigate topics such as architecture as a part of a wider field – in this case urbanism. The topic of the first issue "Paid Urbanism" was originally a University project that Upmeyer and Söhl were planning to do together during the late 1990s, but in the end never did. It was based on the idea of paying people to appear in deserted public spaces to inject artificially life into dead urban areas. Ever since, putting a different adjective or noun next to the word "Urbanism" has become a routine that continues to this day.

Since 2007 - after issue #7 - Upmeyer directs MONU alone, as editor-in-chief, supported by his Rotterdam-based Bureau of Architecture, Research, and Design (BOARD). In 2008 Beatriz Ramo joined MONU as managing and contributing editor, after having supported and collaborated with the magazine since its first issue. What was at first an almost underground magazine made available in pdf format and as a stapled-together, black and white printed version, has evolved over the years into one of the main independent publications and into one of the leading independent architecture magazines published today, bringing together challenging themes explored by interesting writers and theorists. From 2004 until 2020 MONU was published twice a year and since 2021 it appears once a year.

== Circulation ==
In 2011, MONU reported an average circulation of 3,000 copies per issue, two thirds of which were sold in Europe and one third in North America, Australia and New Zealand. MONU has been described as the biggest independent publication focused explicitly on urbanism. MONU's first print-run was very small, around 300 copies. From 2011 until 2015 MONU was also available digitally.

== Innovation ==
MONU's blend of radical passion and expert design has made the magazine itself the focus of several international exhibitions, including in Los Angeles, Madrid and Tokyo. In summer 2007 MONU was part of an open workspace at the documenta 12 - one of the world's most important exhibitions of modern and contemporary art. MONU was invited as part of the documenta's magazines project. MONU is considered to have brought back a new critical edge to the architectural and urban discourse at the beginning of the new millennium and has inspired many others to found similar magazines, particularly between 2005 and 2009. Many of those new magazines were featured together with MONU in the so-called Archizines Exhibition in London in November 2011.

In 2025, MONU received international recognition for its graphic and editorial design, winning the LOOP Design Award for Graphic and Editorial & Magazine Design and the DNA Paris Design Award in the Graphic Design/ Editorial category.

== Features ==
With every new issue, MONU uses the method of "call for submissions" or call for papers (CFP) for collecting contributions. This device of "call for submissions" has been based on the realization that the view of one person is limited. MONU wanted to open the magazine to different and changing perspectives and to focus on diversity, as the core value of the magazine. In that sense, the magazine aims to be open-sourced to its core, collecting and deploying a wide variety of articles, images, concepts, and urban critiques from designers and thinkers from all over the world, recognizing that the traditional journal no longer connects to today's informed audience. MONU's method of the "call for submissions" and its focus on diverse backgrounds and viewpoints from international contributors has found many followers in newer architectural publications that were established after 2005. MONU claims to have introduced the device of "open calls" as a tool to finding contributors to architectural and urban magazines – especially in Europe. Every issue features texts, topic-focused interviews, research, critical analysis, photography, conceptual artwork, and infographics on a defined topic.

== Contributors ==
Past contributors to MONU include:

Center for Urban Pedagogy (CUP), Reinier de Graaf (2004, MONU #1 - Paid Urbanism)
Thomas Sieverts (2005, MONU #2 – Middle Class Urbanism)
Joost Meuwissen (2005, MONU #3 – Political Urbanism)
Yoshiharu Tsukamoto (2006, MONU #4 – Denied Urbanism)
Loïc Wacquant, Eyal Weizman (2006, MONU #5 – Brutal Urbanism)
Supersudaca (2007, MONU #6 – Beautiful Urbanism)
Floris Alkemade (2007, MONU #7 – 2nd Rate Urbanism)
Joep van Lieshout, Teddy Cruz (2008, MONU #8 – Border Urbanism)
Owen Hatherley, Shumon Basar (2008, MONU #9 – Exotic Urbanism)
NL Architects, Kees Christiaanse (2009, MONU #10 – Holy Urbanism)
Gerd Hauser, Office for Metropolitan Architecture (2009, MONU #11 – Clean Urbanism)
Bjarke Ingels, MVRDV (2010, MONU #12 – Real Urbanism)
Hans Frei (2010, MONU #13 – Most Valuable Urbanism)
Rem Koolhaas, Adolfo Natalini, Beatriz Ramo (2011, MONU #14 – Editing Urbanism)
Wouter Vanstiphout, Thomas Ruff (2011, MONU #15 – Post-Ideological Urbanism)
Edward W. Soja, Mike Crang, Stephen Graham (2012, MONU #16 – Non-Urbanism)
Joel Garreau, Saskia Sassen, Kunlé Adeyemi (2012, MONU #17 – Next Urbanism)
Rainer Langhans, Atelier 5, Richard Sennett (2013, MONU #18 – Communal Urbanism)
Antoine Grumbach, Rogers Stirk Harbour + Partners, Office for Metropolitan Architecture (2013, MONU #19 – Greater Urbanism
Bernardo Secchi, Edward Burtynsky, Bart Lootsma (2014, MONU #20 – Geographical Urbanism)
Winy Maas, Candida Höfer, Petra Blaisse (2014, MONU #21 – Interior Urbanism)
Jean-Louis Missika, Bernd Upmeyer, Ulf Hannerz (2015, MONU #22 – Transnational Urbanism)
Jeremy Till, Damon Rich, Marina Abramović (2015, MONU #23 – Participatory Urbanism)
Andrés Jaque, Casco, Herman Hertzberger (2016, MONU #24 – Domestic Urbanism)
Kai Vöckler, Arnis Balcus, Bart Lootsma (2016, MONU #25 – Independent Urbanism)
Lars Lerup, Bureau of Architecture, Research, and Design, Roger Keil, Floris Alkemade, Keller Easterling, Michael Wolf, Mark Power (2017, MONU #26 – Decentralised Urbanism)
Stephan Petermann, Levi Bryant, Nicholas de Monchaux, Marco Casagrande (2017, MONU #27 – Small Urbanism)
STAR strategies + architecture, Alejandro Zaera-Polo, Beatriz Ramo, Stefan Paeleman (2018, MONU #28 – Client-shaped Urbanism)
Cassim Shepard, Pierre Huyghe, Cruz Garcia, Kathrin Golda-Pongratz, Carolyn Drake, Inge Goudsmit (2018, MONU #29 – Narrative Urbanism)
Deane Simpson, Peter Granser, Frits van Dongen, Chris Phillipson, Junya Ishigami, Matthias Hollwich (2019, MONU #30 – Late Life Urbanism)
Karla Rothstein, Miguel Candela, Christopher Coutts, Julie Rugg, Katrina Spade, Cameron Jamie (2019, MONU #31 – After Life Urbanism)
Jörn Walter, Richard Florida, Anne Mie Depuydt, David Schalliol, Will Hartley, DK Osseo-Asare (2020, MONU #32 – Affordable Urbanism)
Beatriz Colomina, Jessica Bridger, Peter Dench, Richard Sennett, Alexander Jachnow, Ian Nazareth, Nadia Shira Cohen (2020, MONU #33 – Pandemic Urbanism)
Mabel O. Wilson, Jeffrey Hou, Ben Parry, Rafal Milach, Ulrich Lebeuf, Hans Pruijt, Bing Guan (2021, MONU #34 – Protest Urbanism)
Mark Wigley, Anya Sirota, Riccardo Dalisi, Isabelle Pateer, MONU's Academic Research Studio (MARS), Peter Behrens School of Arts, Arno Brandlhuber, Ian Nazareth, Olaf Grawert (2022, MONU #35 – Unfinished Urbanism)
Mark Gottdiener, Sharon Zukin, Richard Plunz, Tatjana Schneider, Bharat Sikka, Izaskun Chinchilla (2023, MONU #36 – New Social Urbanism)
Eve Blau, Nikita Dhawan, María do Mar Castro Varela, Johanna-Maria Fritz, Diambra Mariani, Wendy Pullan, Ai Weiwei (2024, MONU #37 – Conflict-driven Urbanism)
Clara Greed, Jo-Anne Bichard, Jone Belausteguigoitia, Doina Petrescu, Elke Krasny, Cristina De Middel, Tony Van Le (2025, MONU #38 – Inclusive Urbanism)
