= Beatriz Ramo =

Spanish architect (born 1979)

Beatriz Ramo (born 11 January 1979, Zaragoza) is a Spanish architect and urbanist living and working in Rotterdam where she opened her own architecture firm STAR strategies + architecture in 2006. She studied at ETSAV at the Polytechnic University of Valencia and at the Eindhoven University of Technology.

Since 2008 Beatriz Ramo is the managing and contributing editor of MONU Magazine on Urbanism, with which she has collaborated since its foundation in 2004.

Since June 2012 Beatriz Ramo is part of the Scientific Council of the AIGP- Atelier International du Grand Paris, when STAR strategies + architecture was selected as one of fifteen teams participating in the second edition of the Atelier.

Before founding STAR Beatriz Ramo worked in 2003 and 2004 for the Dutch firm OMA - Office for Metropolitan Architecture in Rotterdam.
