= David McNulty =

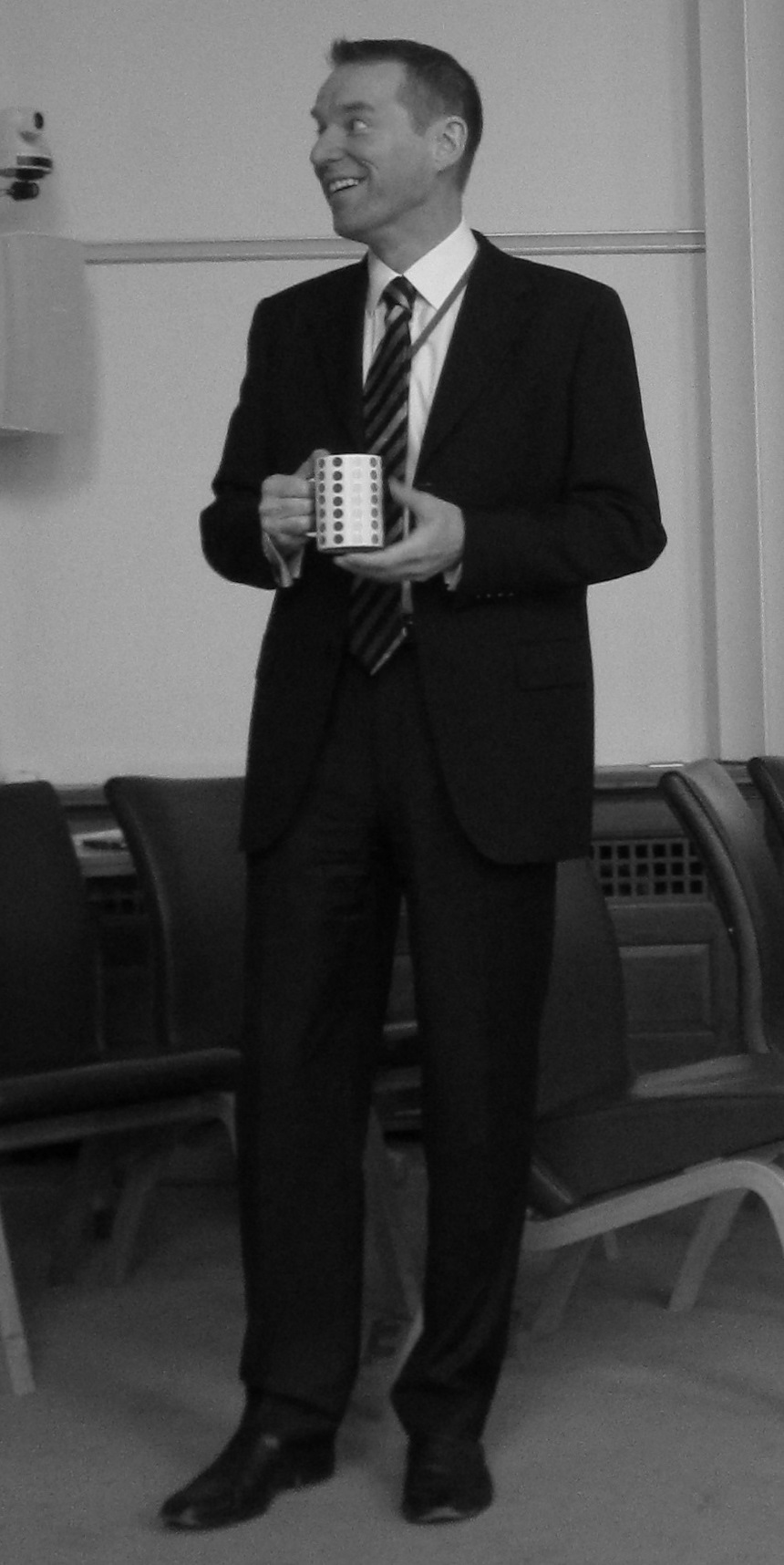

Chief Executive of Surrey County Council
- In office 13 July 2009 – 30 September 2017
- Preceded by: Richard Shaw
- Succeeded by: Julie Fisher (Acting); Joanna Killian

Chief Executive of Trafford Metropolitan Borough Council
- In office 2005–2009
- Succeeded by: Theresa Grant

Personal details
- Salary: £220,295 plus pension contributions

David McNulty is a former local government official, who was Chief Executive of Surrey County Council from 2009 to 2017.

He was educated at Saint Brendan's College. He was previously the Chief Executive of Trafford Metropolitan Borough Council from 2005 to 2009.

McNulty's tenure at Surrey County Council included various controversies, including over his large salary and expenses package, leading to a petition calling for the Council to abolish the £220,295-a-year role to cut costs.

He was further criticised for being on annual leave while the Council debated a 4.99% rise in council tax, during which text messages between Council Leader David Hodge and an official from the Department of Communities and Local Government were raised by Labour Leader Jeremy Corbyn to Theresa May during Prime Minister's Questions on Wednesday 8 February 2017.
