= New Suburbanism =

Urban design movement

New Suburbanism is an urban design movement which intends to improve on existing suburb or exurban designs. New Suburbanists seek to establish an alternative between a dichotomy of the centripetal city and centrifugal suburb, by features such as rear-loading garages and walking-focused landscaping.

The design strategy for New Suburbanism differs from the traditional postwar suburban development. In contrast to post-war suburbanism where the homebuyer had few options in regard to customization, new suburban communities feature customization through packages and add-ons as well as larger homes in denser communities. Postwar suburban developments have since filled in with homes and businesses began emerging there, outside of the city-center. This created new communities, not just suburban housing.

Suburban sprawl is associated with negative effects because it often takes over farm land, disrupts ecosystems, has low-density housing, and car-dependent communities. Suburban sprawl continues to grow as over 70% of Americans choose to live in such communities. Planners are currently seeking to make the suburbs more sustainable and New Suburbanism offers a solution. This planning approach seeks to redesign suburban communities by making them more-dense, equitable, and environmentally sustainable while still keeping housing and design preferences of the consumer in mind.

== Locations ==
- Plum Creek in Kyle, Texas

== Comparison to New Urbanism ==
New Urbanism is a style of planning a new neighborhood that focuses on designing aspects that create more community engagement, whereas New Suburbanism is the improving of an existing suburban neighborhood.

New urbanism, though a small movement, is more successful than New Suburbanism, as NS only has one location and NU has hundreds. Although, the New Suburbanism movement is growing.
