= Joanna Killian =

Former Government official

Joanna Killian OBE
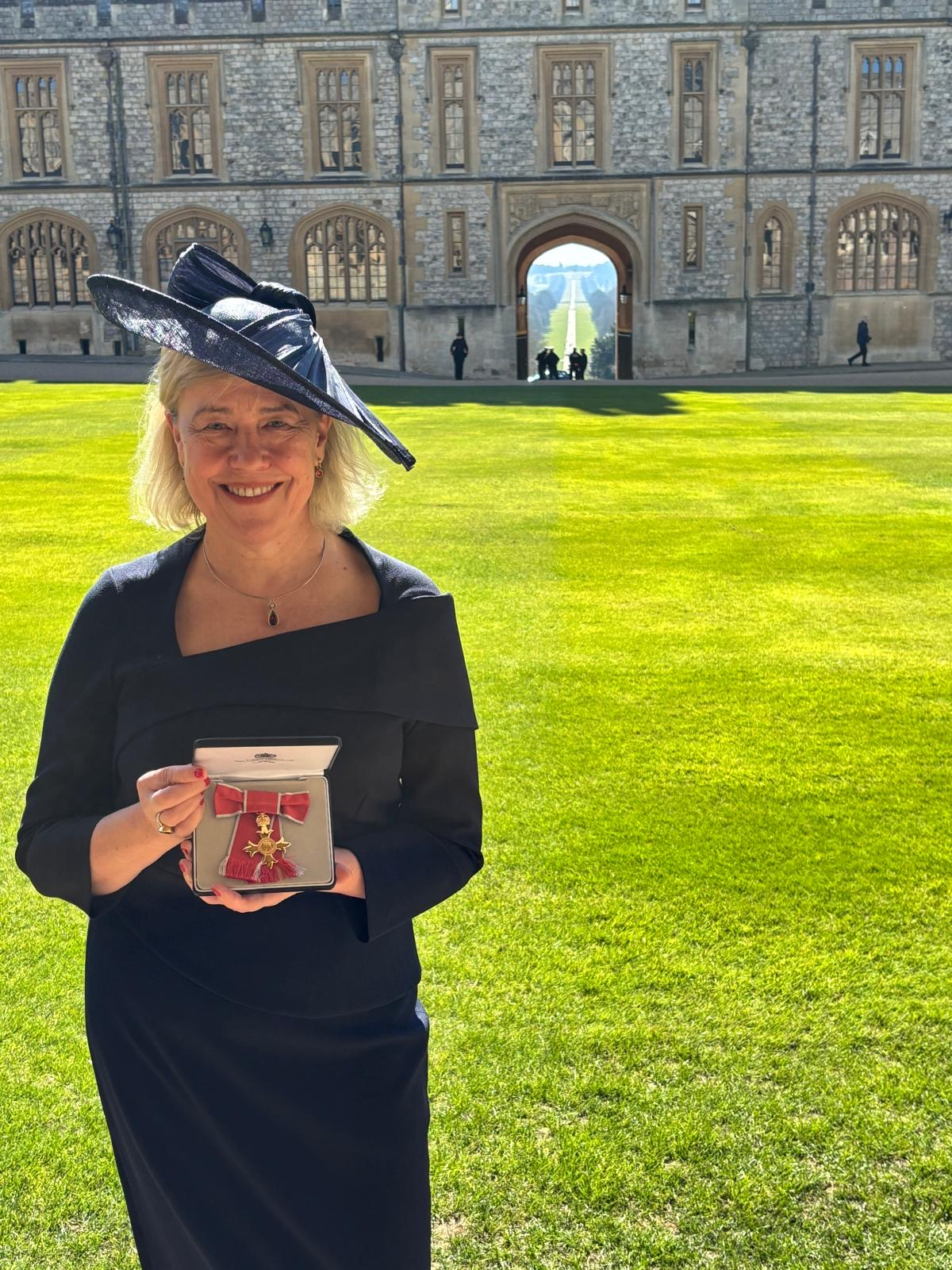

Chief Executive of Local Government Association
- In office March 2024 – July 2026

Chief Executive of Surrey County Council
- In office March 2018 – March 2024
- Preceded by: David McNulty

Chair of Trustees of St Mungo's (charity)
- In office September 2021 – Present
- Preceded by: Robert Napier CBE

Chief Executive of Essex County Council
- In office 2006–2015
- Succeeded by: Gavin Jones

Personal details
- Born: June 1965 (age 61)
- Education: Keele University

Joanna Elizabeth Killian (born June 1965) is a local government official, who was Chief Executive of the Local Government Association from March 2024 to July 2026.

A graduate of Keele University, she was Chief Executive of Essex County Council from 2006 to 2015, and worked at KPMG prior to being appointed Chief Executive of Surrey County Council.

She was appointed chair of trustees of St Mungo's (charity) (Homeless Charity) in September 2021.

Killian was awarded an OBE in the New Years Honours List 2025.
