= Allan Jacobs =

American urban theorist (1928–2025)

Allan B. Jacobs (December 29, 1928 – February 18, 2025) was an urban designer, renowned for his publications and research on urban design. His well-known paper "Toward an Urban Design Manifesto", written with Donald Appleyard, describes how cities should be laid out.

Prior to teaching at Berkeley, Professor Jacobs taught at the University of Pennsylvania, and worked on planning projects in the City of Pittsburgh and for the Ford Foundation in Calcutta, India, and spent eight years as Director of the San Francisco Department of City Planning. In 1978 Jacobs presented his ‘Making City Planning Work’ that offered reflections on his experiences as the San Francisco planning director from 1967 to 1975 and guided on bureaucratic and political processes navigation that often hamper the realization of desired planning policies and outcomes.

His other books include ‘Looking at Cities’ (1985); ‘Great Streets’ (1993) and ‘The Boulevard Book: History, Evolution, Design of Multiway Boulevards’ (with Elizabeth Macdonald and Yodan Rofé, 2003), which both offer case studies that reveal the key elements of successful streets; and ‘The Good City: Reflections and Imaginations’ (2011), a compendium of his career and thinking about cities. Honors include a Guggenheim Fellowship, the Berkeley Citation, and the Kevin Lynch Award from the Massachusetts Institute of Technology.

Jacobs taught in the Department of City and Regional Planning at the University of California, Berkeley from 1975 until 2001, teaching courses in city planning and urban design and serving twice as the department's chair. He then became a Professor emeritus and a consultant in city planning and urban design with projects in California, Oregon, and Brazil, among others.

== Education ==
Jacobs earned a Bachelor of Architecture, cum laude, from Miami University and a master's degree in city planning from the University of Pennsylvania in 1954. He then attended the Harvard Graduate School of Design.

From 1954 to 1955, Jacobs was studying city planning as a Fulbright Scholar at University College London.

== Death ==
Jacobs died February 18, 2025, at the age of 96.

== Notable works ==
- The Urban Design Element of the San Francisco General Plan
- Allan Jacobs and Donald Appleyard, Toward an Urban Design Manifesto. Working Paper published 1982; republished with a prologue in the Journal of the American Planning Association, 1987.
- Making City Planning Work (1980)
- Looking at Cities (1985)
- Great Streets (1995)
- The Boulevard Book (2003) with Elizabeth MacDonald and Yodan Rofe
- The Good City: Reflections and Imaginations (2011)

== Honors ==
- Athena Medal from the Congress for the New Urbanism, 2008.
- Kevin Lynch Award, presented at MIT's "Imaging the City" symposium, 1999.
- AIA Excellence in Education Award, California Chapter, 1994
- Resident in Architecture, American Academy in Rome, 1996
- Guggenheim Fellowship awarded in 1981
- Fulbright Scholar
