= ArchiLab =

ArchiLab is an annual architectural exposition and conference held in Orléans in France. So far, there have been ArchiLab projects every year from 1999 to 2008.

== ArchiLab 2001 ==
More than 90 architects were invited to present their projects during the third International meeting on Architecture held in Orléans in 2001. This meeting brings together the architects of the world for whom lodging together is a chance to think about new conceptual strategies. Faced with increasing standardization in the construction industry and the fashion of dwellings in constant change, the challenge of the innovator is to adapt to these times of constant change. Modern communications have introduced us to a greater cultural diversity but, on the other hand, increasing industrialization has led to uniformity in the construction process.

The projects are grouped in a way to represent various attitudes towards the question of housing.

- Individual or collective habitation
- Flexibility
- Effects on landscape
- New lifestyles
- Subversion
- Form and process of creation
