= Urban theory =

Theoretical examination of aspects of cities

Urban theory describes the economic, political, and social processes which affect the formation and development of cities.

== Overview ==
Theoretical discourse has often polarized between economic determinism and cultural determinism with scientific or technological determinism adding another contentious issue of reification. Studies across eastern and western nations have suggested that certain cultural values promote economic development and that the economy in turn changes cultural values. Urban historians were among the first to acknowledge the importance of technology in city development. Technology embeds the single most dominant characteristic of a city, and the networked character of the city is perpetuated by information technology. Regardless of the deterministic stance (economic, cultural or technological), in the context of globalization, there is a mandate to mold the city to complement the global economic structure and urbanomics gains ascendancy.

== Political processes ==
Lewis Mumford described monumental architecture as an "expression of power" seeking to produce "respectful terror". Gigantism, geometry, and order are characteristic of cities such as Washington, D.C., New Delhi, Beijing and Brasília.

== Economic capital and globalization ==
The Industrial Revolution was accompanied by urbanization in Europe and the United States in the 19th century. Friedrich Engels studied Manchester, which was being transformed by the cotton industry. He noted how the city was divided between wealthy areas and working class areas, which were physically separated from one another (and the people living in those areas could not see each other easily). The city was therefore a function of capital.

Georg Simmel studied the effect of the urban environment on the individuals living in cities, arguing in The Metropolis and Mental Life that the increase in human interaction affected relationships. The activity and anonymity of the city led to a 'blasé attitude' with reservations and aloofness by urban denizens. This was also driven by the market economy of the city, which corroded traditional norms. However, people in cities were also more tolerant and sophisticated.

Henri Lefebvre argued in the 1960s and 1970s that urban space is dominated by the interests of corporations and capitalism. Private places such as shopping centres and office buildings dominate the public space. The economic relations could be seen in the city itself, with wealthy areas being far more opulent than the run-down areas inhabited by poor people. To fix this, a right to the city needed to be asserted to give everyone a say in urban space.

== Economic sustainability ==
Urbanomics can spill over beyond the city parameters. The process of globalization extends its territories into global city regions. Essentially, they are territorial platforms (metropolitan extensions from key cities, chain of cities linked within a state territory or across inter-state boundaries and arguably; networked cities and/or regions cutting across national boundaries) interconnected in the globalized economy. Some see global city-regions, rather than global cities, as the nodes of a global network.

The rules of engagement are built on economic sustainability – the ability to continuously generate wealth. The cornerstones of this economic framework are the following ‘4C’ attributes: (1) currency flow for trading, (2) commoditization of products and services in supply chain management, (3) command centre function in orchestrating interdependency and monitoring executions, and (4) consumerization. Unless, decoupling the economy from these attributes can be demonstrated; symbolic capital expressions, as legitimate as they may be, must accept the domineering status of urbanomics.

== Revisiting economic measurements ==
Arguably, the culprit of this economic entrapment is the high-consumption lifestyle synonymous with wealth. The resolve may well be that ‘less is more’ and that true welfare lies not in a rise in production and income. As such, Gross Domestic Product (GDP) is increasingly being questioned and considered inaccurate and inadequate. GDP includes things that do not contribute to sustainable growth, and excludes non-monetary benefits that improve the welfare of the people. In response, alternative measures have been proposed, including the Genuine Progress Indicator (GPI) and the Index of Sustainable Economic Welfare (ISEW).

== See also ==
- Landscape urbanism
- MONU (magazine) - publication about urbanism
- Rural economics
- Urban economics
- Urban decay
- Urban development
- Urban planning
- Urban sociology
- Urban studies
- Urban vitality

== Notes ==
- Fainstein, Susan S.; Campbell, Scott (eds.) (2011) Readings in Urban Theory (3rd ed.), John Wiley & Sons. ISBN 9781444330816.
- Harding, Alan; Blokland, Talja (2014) Urban Theory: A Critical Introduction to Power, Cities and Urbanism in the 21st Century, London: Sage.
- Aseem Inam, Designing Urban Transformation New York and London: Routledge, 2013. ISBN 978-0415837705.
- Jayne, Mark; Ward, Kevin (eds.) (2017) Urban Theory: New critical perspectives, London and New York: Routledge. ISBN 978-1-138-79337-8.
- Papageorgiou, Y. & Pines, D. (1999) An Essay on Urban Economic Theory, London: Kluwer Academic Publishers.
- Short, John Rennie (2014) Urban Theory: A Critical Assessment (2nd ed.), Palgrave Macmillan. ISBN 9781137382641.
- Steingart, G. (2008) The War for Wealth. The True Story of Globalization or Why the Flat World is Broken, New York: McGraw Hill.
