= Regional Development Strategy (Northern Ireland) =

Northern Ireland Executive spatial plan

The Regional Development Strategy is a statutory spatial development document for Northern Ireland that is written by the Department for Infrastructure in the Northern Ireland Executive. It is updated from time to time.

== Background ==
Historically, Northern Ireland did not have a set of published planning policies equivalent to the planning policy guidance notes (of England and Wales) or the national planning policy guidelines (of Scotland).

Under the Strategic Planning (Northern Ireland) Order 1999, publication of the Regional Development Strategy became a responsibility of the Department for Regional Development. Today, this is a responsibility of the Department for Infrastructure.

Under the Planning Act (Northern Ireland) Act 2011, local authorities are required to consider the regional development strategy when writing their community plans.

In June 1997, the Mo Mowlam consulted on the first draft Regional Development Strategy, and the strategy was published in full form in 2001.

== Contents ==
The strategy divides Northern Ireland into several sub-regions, and contains specific policies for each sub-region.

The strategy adopts an infrastructure-led approach.

The 2001 version of the Regional Development Strategy widened the scope of the planning profession in Northern Ireland and set a high-level perspective for the entire region taking account of the status of Northern Ireland as a divided society.

The strategy encourages cross-border co-operation with the Republic of Ireland.
