= List of urban planners =

List of urban planners chronological by initial year of plan.

- c. 332 BC Dinocrates – Alexandria, Egypt
- c. 408 BC Hippodamus of Miletus – Piraeus (port of Athens), Thurii, Rhodes
- 330-336 CE Constantine – Byzantium replanned and rebuilt as the city of Constantinople
  - c. 413 – Flavius Anthemius – Theodosian Walls
  - c. 527-565 – Constantinople replanned under Justinian after the Nika riots, under the supervision of architects including Isidore of Miletus and Anthemius of Tralles. City replanned around the Sacred Palace, the Hagia Sophia, and the Basilica Cistern, rather than Augusteum.
  - c. 1453 – Constantinople rebuilt as an Ottoman capital by Mehmed the Conqueror, Atik Sinan, and other Ottoman architects, with additions including the Grand Bazaar, the Fatih Mosque, the Imperial Arsenal, and the Sublime Porte at the new Topkapı Palace.
  - c. 1509 – Constantinople replanned again following the 1509 Constantinople earthquake by Selim I and his brother Şehzade Ahmet, during the reign of their father, Bayezid II.
- c. 1450 AD Nezahualcoyotl – Texcoco (altepetl), Aztec Mexico
- c. 1590 Tokugawa Ieyasu, Tokugawa Hidetada, Tokugawa Iemitsu, Takatora Todo – Edo, later Tokyo, Japan
- 1598 Sheikh Baha ad-Din – Isfahan
- 1666 Christopher Wren – London
- 1681 Johan Caspar von Cicignon – Trondheim
- 1682 William Penn and Thomas Holme – Philadelphia
- 1727 Maharaja Jai Singh II – astronomer, city planner, Jaipur, Rajasthan, India
- 1791 Peter Charles L'Enfant and Andrew Ellicott – Washington, D.C.
- 1805 Augustus B. Woodward – Detroit
- 1811 Gouverneur Morris, John Rutherfurd, and Simeon De Witt – Commissioners' Plan of New York City
- c. 1838 Joseph Smith and later Brigham Young – several Mormon settlements including Nauvoo, Illinois and Salt Lake City
- 1853 Georges-Eugène Haussmann – responsible for the broad avenues of Paris
- 1859 Ildefons Cerdà – planner of the Eixample district of Barcelona
- 1862 James Hobrecht – Hobrecht-Plan for Berlin
- c. 1880 Solon Spencer Beman and George Pullman – Pullman, Chicago
- 1880 Pedro Benoit – La Plata, Argentina
- 1882 Arturo Soria y Mata – the Ciudad Lineal, Madrid
- 1898 Ebenezer Howard – Garden city movement
- 1901 Charles Follen McKim – Washington, D.C. revised plan
- 1909 Daniel Burnham – Chicago
- 1912 Walter Burley Griffin – Canberra
- 1912 Johan Albrecht Ehrenström – Helsinki
- 1915 Alfred Bettman
- 1920-1932 Richard Kauffmann – Haifa, Ramat Gan, Afula, Herzliya, Jerusalem
- 1924 Andrew R. Cobb and Thomas Adams – Corner Brook, Newfoundland
- 1924 Clarence Stein – Sunnyside Gardens, Queens, New York; Chatham Village, Pittsburgh; Baldwin Hills Village, Los Angeles
- 1925 Ernst May – city plan and housing units in Frankfurt, Germany, including Siedlung Römerstadt
- 1925 Patrick Geddes - city plan for Tel Aviv, the Geddes Plan.
- 1927–1929 Patrick Geddes – Tel Aviv
- 1927 Bruno Taut – Hufeisensiedlung (Horseshoe Projects), Berlin
- 1928 Henry Wright – Radburn, New Jersey
- c. 1930 Robert Moses – responsible for the urban renewal of New York City
- 1930 Ernst May – Magnitogorsk and some 20 other urban projects in the Soviet Union
- 1932 Hermann Jansen – Ankara, Türkiye
- 1935 Frank Lloyd Wright – Broadacre City (concept)
- 1935–1981 Eldridge Lovelace – many US cities
- 1938 Susan Fainstein
- 1938 Donald Gibson – Coventry, England
- 1942 Arthur Korn and Felix Samuely – MARS plan for London
- 1950 Le Corbusier – Chandigarh, India
- 1955 Stanley Wardley – Bradford, Yorkshire, England
- 1957 Lúcio Costa – Brasília, Brazil
- 1958 Ludwig Mies van der Rohe, Ludwig Hilberseimer, Alfred Caldwell – Lafayette Park, Detroit
- 1960 Edmund Bacon – engaged in the redevelopment of parts of Philadelphia
- 1960 William Pereira – Irvine, California
- 1960 Konstantinos Doxiadis – Islamabad, Pakistan
- 1963 Dariush Borbor – Tehran, Iran
- 1963 Mort Hoppenfeld, James Rouse – Columbia, Maryland
- 1964 Jaime Lerner – Curitiba, Brazil (transportation and land use combination)
- 1964 Robert E. Simon – Reston, Virginia
- 1966 Walt Disney – Experimental Prototype Community of Tomorrow (concept) (Note: While never built in the form Disney intended, Walt Disney World, where EPCOT was planned, houses an amusement park by the same name and is also near the Disney Company-founded town of Celebration, Florida.)
- 1968 Agustín Landa Verdugo – Cancún, Mexico
- 1970 Paolo Soleri – Arcosanti, Arizona, as well as his concept of arcologies
- 1970 William Pereira, Ian McHarg – The Woodlands, Texas
- 1972 Constantinos A. Doxiadis – Riyadh, Saudi Arabia
- 1973 Moshe Safdie – Coldspring New Town, Baltimore
- 1984 Andrés Duany, Elizabeth Plater-Zyberk – Seaside, Florida
- 1984 Jesús Permuy - Little Havana Redevelopment Plan, Miami, Florida
- 1990 Peter Calthorpe – Laguna West, California
- 2003 Christopher Charles Benninger – Thimphu, Bhutan
- 2011 V. P. Kulshrestha – Bhopal, India
- 2015 Kongjian Yu – Sponge City initiative in China
- 2018 Archimedes Muzenda – Harare, Zimbabwe

== See also ==
- List of urban theorists
- List of urban plans
- List of planned communities
- List of landscape architects
- Landscape architecture
- Urban planner
- Urban planning
- Distinguished Canadian Planners
