= Online land planning =

Online land planning is a collaborative process in which sustainable development practices and design professionals from across the world are networked to provide advice and solutions on urban design and land planning issues. The target audience includes property owners, communities, businesses and government agencies that have limited access, time, finances or personnel to make informed decisions about land use. In many cases, this approach provides electronic documents that become the catalyst to rebuild after natural or man-made spur rural community development and stimulate or create a new microeconomy.

== Importance of technology ==
One goal of online land planning is the effective use of the internet to support information sharing and decision making from remote locations such as the home. The use of the Internet, coupled with software technology such as geographic information systems (GIS), allows municipalities and other public and private organizations to compile base information, exchange information, present solutions to land planning issues, and receive feedback vis the internet. Benefits for land development companies and real estate industry organizations like the Urban Land Institute include easier access to efficient digital planning technologies, along with the opportunity for immediate participation and feedback.

Worldwide, local and regional governments have created their own websites with access to map-centric and enterprise GIS databases that provide operational and public-service resources.
