= Urban planning in ancient Egypt =

The use of urban planning in ancient Egypt is a matter of continuous debate. Because ancient sites usually survive only in fragments, and many ancient Egyptian cities have been continuously inhabited since their original forms, relatively little is actually understood about the general designs of Egyptian towns for any given period.

The Egyptians referred to most cities as either nwt or dmj. Nwt usually refers to unplanned cities that grew naturally, such as Memphis and Thebes, while dmj can be translated as "settlement" and usually refers to towns that were laid out along a plan. The archaeological evidence of such cities is best preserved, and has been most thoroughly delved, at El Lahun, Deir el-Medina, and Amarna, though some averment of urban planning exists at other sites as well.

== Predynastic period ==
Almost no traces of Egyptian settlements exist before the development of Neolithic culture around 6000 BC, as settlements were certainly very small, and buildings were made of perishable materials such as reeds and were not meant to be permanent structures. Sites that do survive do not show much evidence of urban planning. The earliest known predynastic settlement is at Merimda-Beni Salame at the southwest desert edge of the Nile Delta and covers about 44 acres (180,000 m^{2}), a very large area for the predynastic period. The city was rebuilt three times during its inhabited life, and in at least one of its incarnations, its houses were placed very regularly along a main street. Almost all the houses follow a plan which faces their doorways to the northwest, to avoid the prevailing northerly wind.

Other known pre-dynastic settlements, such as those of the Badarian and Naqada cultures, are laid out arbitrarily and lack a defining plan. These villages mostly consisting of small huts situated around circular storage pits.

== Tell el-Dab'a ==
At Tell el-Dab'a were excavated remains of a settlement dating to the early Middle Kingdom (about 2000 BC). The ancient name of the town is not known. An area of about 100 to 100 meters were uncovered, therefore, only parts of the settlements are known. The settlements consisted of at least ten rows of houses divided by straight streets. There is evidence that the town was surrounded by a wall. Remains were found in the north. Here there was also a bigger building. The east side of the settlements had an open space. The rows of houses on the east side (west of the open space) consisted of blocks with twelve houses. The single houses were small, just about 5 by 5 meters large and all built on the same plan. The rows of houses on the west side consisted of blocks of at least twenty houses, but perhaps even more. The settlement was inhabited only for about twenty years.

== El-Lahun ==
The workmen's village at El-Lahun was built and inhabited during the reign of Senusret II of the Twelfth Dynasty. Located near the entrance to the channel of the Nile that leads to the Faiyum Oasis, it housed the workers who constructed Senusret's pyramid as well as the priests who maintained the royal funerary cult, and possibly even the king himself. The village was apparently only fully inhabited during the king's reign.

The village was organized according to a regular plan. It was centered on the temple of Senusret's pyramid, which visually dominated the village, and it consisted of two unequal quarters enclosed by mudbrick walls on at least three sides. The smaller western quarter contained the relatively humble dwellings of the workers that were laid out on a rectangular grid pattern. Flinders Petrie, who first excavated the site, noted how the layout of the neighborhood would allow a single nightwatchman to easily guard the area. The houses all followed the same basic pattern and dimensions, and they were evenly spaced along the parallel streets. The streets were paved, and stone drainage channels built into them, leading to a central drain, allowed the disposal of dirty water from the houses. The much larger eastern quarter contained considerably larger buildings, including mansions, an "acropolis" with an attached guard building, storerooms, a few more workers' dwellings, and some buildings at the far east side whose purposes are unknown.

== Deir el-Medina ==
The workmen's village at Deir el-Medina, located in a valley on the west bank of the Nile across from Thebes, was first constructed under Thutmose I of the Eighteenth Dynasty to house the workers who worked on the tombs in the nearby Valley of the Kings during the New Kingdom. The village is surrounded by a thin mudbrick wall and built around a central street. Houses were connected at the sides, sharing walls for building and space efficiency. It is possible that entire blocks of houses were covered by a single roof.

The original village had 20 houses, probably supporting a population of about 100 people. The village was expanded once under Thutmose III, and when the workers returned to Deir el-Medina after the reign of Akhenaten, during which they were transferred to Amarna, the village was expanded again and formed nine distinct quarters. At its largest point, Deir el-Medina contained 120 houses and probably about 600 inhabitants.

== Amarna ==
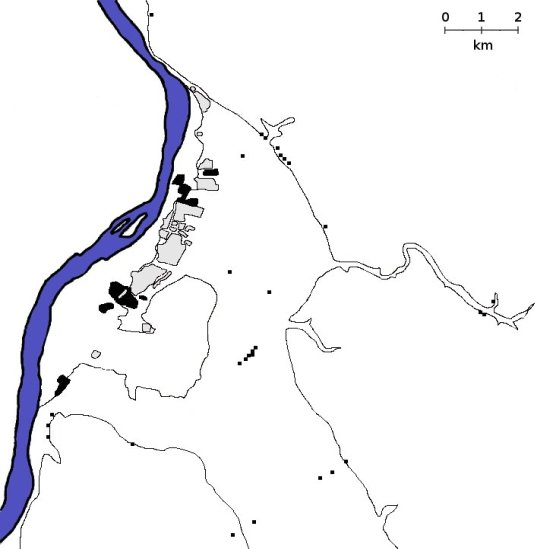

Akhenaten of the eighteenth Dynasty built Akhetaten as the new capital city of Egypt. For the location, he chose Amarna, a fresh site on the eastern bank of the Nile, about 275 kilometers northwest of the old capital city of Thebes. After his death, the city was virtually abandoned. The degree of planning involved in the construction of Amarna involved for the most part the administrative and religious buildings of the Central City. Even the planned part of the city was somewhat hastily designed and assembled. Most of the city was built along an eight kilometer north–south main street, referred to today as the "Royal Road", which connected the Central City with the North City, an outlying satellite and the probable residence of the king. The king probably lived in the North Riverside Palace in the North City, a large building on the east side of the Royal Road and separate from the rest of the city, protected by a fortified wall which enclosed a complex of royal service buildings. On the opposite side of the road from the palace lay a group of some of the largest houses in the city, probably belonging to nobles who were close to the king. An administrative building containing an enormous warehouse formed the northern limit of the North City. At the southern end of the Royal Road lay the Central City, a group of temples, palaces, and administrative buildings forming the executive hub of the city. The planned buildings of the Central City can be found in an inscription on one of the Amarna Boundary Stelae which marked the boundaries of the city at its founding. In it, Akhenaten describes the main buildings he will construct in his new capital:

… I am making a House of the Aten for the Aten my father in Akhetaten in this place. I am making the Mansion of the Aten for the Aten my father in Akhetaten in this place. I am making the "Sunshade of Re" of the [great] royal wife … for the Aten my father in Akhetaten in this place. I am making a House of Rejoicing for the Aten my father in the island of "Aten distinguished in jubilees" in Akhetaten in this place. I have made a house of Re-[joicing of the Aten] for the Aten my father in the island of "Aten distinguished in jubilees" in Akhetaten in this place.

Some of these buildings can be identified easily by their inscriptions, but we know the names of others only through this speech. On the entire western side of the road and probably reaching down to the riverside was the Great Palace, consisting of several stone courts and halls, and housing at its center a huge courtyard surrounded by statues of Akhenaten. Across the road and connected by a brick bridge lay the King's House, a small palace and residence of the king. South of the palace (on the west side of the road) was the Mansion of the Sun-disc, a religious building whose purpose is not completely understood but was likely the king's mortuary temple. In the northernmost position on the east side of the road in the Central City was the largest temple of all, the House of the Sun-disc, or the Great Temple of the Aten, which lay on an east–west axis and consisted of a rectangular walled area measuring 760 by 290 meters, enclosing several individual temples. Near the temples were long storehouses and priests' housing. Due east of the king's house were offices, the archives (in which the Amarna Letters were found), and police and military barracks. On the eastern outskirts of the Central City was a walled workmen's village housing the workers during the city's construction. Villas of the king's vizier and priests sprawled along both sides of the Royal Road to the south. At the far south of the city was an unusual complex called the Maru-Aten, a walled complex of gardens, pools, an artificial island, and open-air kiosks. While it was originally mistaken by excavators as a sort of pleasure resort, it is understood now to be a religious building.

Most of Amarna's housing was in two large areas north and south of the Central City. These sprawling suburbs housed the large population needed to maintain the court and run the administration of the Central City. Residing in the suburbs was a very mixed collection of social groups, the priests, soldiers, builders, sculptors and scribes having the most prominent houses. As far as the residential sections of Amarna are concerned, there is almost a complete absence of an imposed layout. Outside the corridor of the Royal Road, there were a few broad, far from straight streets running more or less north and south and joining the suburbs to the center, crossed by perpendicular, smaller streets. The houses themselves are arranged in arbitrary clusters which create distinct neighborhoods. There does not seem to be any concept of "prime location" except to be located on one of the main north–south streets, and rich and poor seemed to live side by side. Proximity to the Central City or the Royal Road seems to have been unimportant, and there is at least one example of a royal vizier who seems to have chosen to live as far away from the king as possible.

== See also ==
- Index of urban planning articles

== Bibliography ==
- Fairman, H. W. "Topographical Notes on the Central City, Tell el-‘Amarnah", Journal of Egyptian Archaeology 21 (1935): 135–139.
- Kemp, Barry. "The City of el-Amarna as a Source for the Study of Urban Society in Ancient Egypt". World Archaeology 9.2 (1977): 123–139.
- Kemp, Barry. Ancient Egypt: Anatomy of a Civilization, Second Edition, Routledge, London, New York 2006, ISBN 978-0-415-23550-1, 2006.
- Redford, Donald B. Akhenaten, the Heretic King. Princeton University Press, 1984.
- Uphill, Eric. Egyptian Towns and Cities. Oxford: Shire, 2008.
