= Hudson's village model =

Geographical model of United Kingdom villages

Hudson's village model is a geographical model of United Kingdom villages which shows the development of rural settlement patterns in villages over time. It was developed around the Lincoln, Lincolnshire area by Hudson. R (1977) an English born geographer specialising in Urban geography, who currently lectures at the University of Durham.

== Stages ==
The model identifies three stages:

1. Change in land use, existing buildings converted into housing and infill of houses on vacant land. There are also some additions to the village edge including farm buildings
2. Ribbon development – housing built along major routes from the village
3. Large scale planned additions such as housing estates on village fringe

The first stage consists of the initial village buildings that are the 'core' of the village. These tend to be located around the church. In the second stage, there is an infill of houses as the demand for them increases. This is linked with increases in population in the UK and improvements in healthcare and quality of life. Stage three occurs mainly to coincide with the popularity of Counter Urbanisation where dense housing estates are built to cater for people wanting to live in areas of high quality of environment, such as that found in many rural villages.
