= Strategic urban planning =

Strategic Urban Planning (SUP) is a methodical approach aimed at shaping the future of urban areas. It involves setting clear objectives, coordinating public and private efforts, and adapting to new circumstances to enhance the living conditions of the affected citizens. SUP is not a new concept; it has been applied to various aspects of human activity, with notable figures such as Sun Tzu, Arthur Thomson, and Henry Mintzberg contributing to its development.

Fifteen years of practice proved to be enough time for the technique to spread and for the first “Meeting of American and European cities for the Exchange of Experiences in Strategic Planning” to be organized. Institutions sponsoring the meeting, held in Barcelona in 1993, included the Inter-American Development Bank, the European Community Commission and the Iberoamerican Cooperation Institute. The cities of Amsterdam, Lisbon, Lille, Barcelona, Toronto and Santiago de Chile participated, among others.

At that meeting it was demonstrated, along with other relevant aspects, that if cooperative processes are used in large cities in order to carry out strategic planning processes, and if a reasonable degree of comprehension is reached between the administration, businesses and an ample representation of social agents, organizational synergies will develop that will eventually improve resource management and citizens’ quality of life.

== History ==
Strategic Urban Planning processes (SUP), also known as Urban Renewal Projects, began to appear at the end of the 20th century. The city of San Francisco (U.S.A.) carried out its process between 1982 and 1984. The main motivation behind starting strategic urban planning processes was the attempt to adequately react to problematic situations (mainly economic crisis or standstill). At the beginning of the 21st century, this kind of organization is not reactive but proactive. In the case of Spain, crisis situations are not the main causes of these processes, rather they are motivated by the search for an improved level of public-private cooperation, the wish to coordinate activity, continued improvements, the wish to launch revitalization processes and even to follow others . The initial determination needed to launch this type of processes varies by region; in Spain, most processes are fronted by public entities, approximately 50%, while a significant percentage has mixed public-private leadership.

== Description of SUP processes ==
An SUP process, according to Borja and Castells is:

The definition of a city project that unifies diagnoses, specifies public and private actions and establishes a coherent mobilization framework for the cooperation of urban social actors. A participative process is a priority when defining contents, as this process will be the basis for the viability of the objectives and actions proposed. The result of the Strategic plan should not necessarily be the creation of regulations or a government program (although its adoption by the State and Local Government should mean the instigation of regulations, investment, administrative measures, policy initiatives, etc) but rather a policy contract between public institutions and civil society. For this reason, the process following the approval of the plan and the monitoring and implementation of measures or actions is just as or more important than the process of elaboration and consensual approval.

SUP is now considered a type of Governance.

== Basic Stages of an SUP process ==
- Using the work of the Technical Secretary as a starting point, work groups debate and approve a diagnosis of the city that includes its localisation. The document must be approved by the executive committee, by the General Council or a full meeting of the corporation as the case may be.
- Based on the diagnosis, and keeping in mind its antecedents and conclusions, strengths and weaknesses, the next step is the creation of scenarios and, based on the use of imagination and rigour, the development of prospective tasks related to the creation of future alternatives so that the executive committee can select a model or vision for the city. Their choice will be the basis for the generation of related key topics and/or directions for general actions to be taken.
- Once the work teams have been reorganized, mainly made up of key decision-makers and implementers, each key topic and line of action will be dealt with separately, designing a detailed list of necessary and/or advisable projects. Once the results have been consolidated, a prioritised list of projects will be made available from which a selection will be made. The next step is the elaboration of an action plan that includes the agents involved, timing and resources. The people involved in the structure of the process, at least theoretically, are capable of carrying it out; for an example, please consult the document from the General Council of SUP of Valencia .
- Once all of the previously mentioned documents have been approved, the next step is implementation - carrying out the project itself. This stage is decisive; at this point plans are usually given a structure in which the organization is even more explicitly clarified.

== Implementation of SUP processes ==
The social and economic importance of these processes is quite relevant as they affect millions of people . In Spain, there are nearly one hundred localities that use this methodology, affecting a total population of nearly 15 million people.

== Critical Comments on SUP processes ==
Sectors in the area of civic participation, as well as planning professionals and political activists have all expressed criticism of SUP processes.

However, SUP processes include aspects that favour selective participation, territorial organization and coordination/cooperation between public and private sectors. On the other hand, Strategic Urban Planning processes seem to be independent of political ideologies (for example, the SUP processes in Barcelona , Bilbao and Valencia are carried out with mixed Government teams including the following Spanish political formations: PSC-PSOE , PNV and PP respectively) and can produce a notable degree of stability in the majority behind the project.

== Theoretical Development ==
Knowledge relating to strategic urban planning processes is evolving in two complementary directions that can be denominated, borrowing concepts from programming, as Bottom-Up and Top-down.

=== Bottom-Up ===
There are clear differences between what could be called the traditional approach to Strategic planning and the emerging approach (Fernández Güell. Strategic planning of cities).

- Before Product predominance, now Process predominance
- Before Sector specific, now Integrated
- Before Normative, now Strategic
- Before Goal-oriented, now Cost-benefit oriented
- Before Urban-offer oriented, now Urban-demand oriented
- Before Subject to administrative limitations, now Supersedes administrative limitations and enters in Metropolitan areas
- Before Open participation, now Focused Participation

Of course, in 2006 there was a clear evolution that attempted to adapt to changes, political sensitivities and even trends. In any case, this is a line of thought and action that takes full advantage of the experience of projects that have already been implemented.

=== Top-Down ===
Given that:

- The influence of each agent in the global process under consideration for implementation is yet to be determined;
- There are no generally accepted criteria when creating instruments for measuring progress or regression on the path toward achieving main goals;
- Cooperation processes among different agents within the city to carry out strategic planning are usually undertaken using a “framework” organisational structure which highlights differences;
- Both politics and outside events affect a large city;

this line of research seeks to further the design of a model that will determine the factors related to the success of strategic planning processes in large cities and metropolitan areas es:Aglomeraciones urbanas en la Unión Europea es:Area Metropolitana es:Área metropolitana de Valencia.

Within this branch of research, which seeks a more general theory, two recent Doctoral Theses mentioned in the bibliography can be consulted for further information.

It should be pointed out that a theory explaining Strategic Urban Planning in Metropolitan Areas and/or Regions would involve furthering the consolidation of Social Design es:Diseño Social as a scientific study.

== Bibliography ==
- Borja y Castells. “Local y Global”. 1998.
- Fernández Güell, J. Miguel. Planificación estratégica de ciudades. 1997.
- Ganau Casas, Mallarach Isern. “Planificació estratégica territorial a Catalunya”. 2003.
- Pascual Esteve, Josep Mª. “La gestión estratégica de las ciudades”. 2002.
- Quintás Alonso, José. “Análisis de los factores y políticas comunitarias que favorecen el diseño y ejecución de la planificación estratégica de Grandes Ciudades y Áreas Metropolitanas, basándose en las experiencias de Barcelona, Bilbao y Valencia”, tesis doctoral leída en febrero de 2006.
- Sanguino Galván, Ramón. “Gestión del conocimiento y competitividad: análisis en las ciudades españolas”, tesis doctoral leída en enero de 2005.
- Seisdedos, Gildo. Cómo gestionar las ciudades del siglo XXI. Introducción de A. Ruiz Gallardón. Madrid: Prentice Hall (Financial Times), 2007. 204 p. ISBN 978-8483223567
- Seisdedos, Gildo. El futuro de la planificación estratégica urbana: del PEU a la EDU. Análisis Local, Vol.78, marzo 2008, (3): 17 - 23. ISSN 1575-5266 http://www.eeg.afi.es/EEGPublicaciones/publicaciones/992429/746522/analisis-local-78-numero-78-iii-2008.html

== See also ==
- Planning
- Strategic Planning
- Urban Planning
