= Urban plans in Iran =

Urban plans in Iran are based on approximately 40 years of experience. All of these variable plans have been executed based on comprehensive planning. According to a census conducted in February 1999, 304 master plans (including national, regional, urban, and new-cities plans) had been approved; that figure has climbed to 350 plans. The Industrial Revolution was considered as a turning point for great changes in cities but this change belongs mostly to Western cities that existed prior to the 20th century. The fast development and prosperity of urban planning discussed here refer to the first years of the 20th century.

== Approaches to urban planning ==
In recent years, exacerbation of urban problems has formed two views on urban planning Iran.

=== Comprehensive and rational ===
This approach asserts that there are not suitable conditions and enough infrastructure to use acceptable new tools in urban planning and states that planners have to follow their traditional ways in urban plans.

=== Strategic and structural ===
Thinkers of this approach believe that qualitative changes during the time, insufficient pattern in urban development plans to cater for the demands of society, globalization, and the necessity of adapting to changes with urban plans, necessitate the use of a new pattern in society.

It recognizes the limitations and problems in these plans in the context of Iran and offers a systematic approach as a transition tool from comprehensive approach to strategic approach in the urban planning system.

== Master development plans ==
This pattern was formed by Patrick Geddes, who established urban planning, and his student Lewis Mumford. They were biologists who could use the methods of ecology and biology to discuss organic theory in urban planning. Master development plans have been created by combining this theory with new urban functionalism theory over half a century.

== Systematic approach in urban planning ==
Twenty-five years experience of urban planning after the war demonstrated the difficulties of a master plan in Europe. Along with these problems there was increasingly critical opinion about the fundamental theory. During the 1960s and 1970s, theories and experience of urban planning in Western Europe, the United States, Canada, and Japan led to a systematic approach. Final goals of the systematic approach are:

1. Far from master and rational plans
2. Follow economic, social, and cultural goals
3. Combine planning and management
4. Completion of approaches and methods in urban planning in framework plans

== Strategic approach in urban planning ==
Specifications of strategic-structural plans show they are better than comprehensive plans. The most important specifics of these plans are:

1. Cyclical process of preparation of these plans
2. Flexibility and envisaging probable failures and the possibility of reviewing the perspective, general objectives, and strategies
3. Possibility of participation of people in preparation, approval, implementation, and review of these plans

Iranian managers are supporting comprehensive plans despite the fact that such plans were proven outdated in other countries over four decades ago. Support extended by Iranian officials to comprehensive plans is the main challenge facing strategic-structural ones.

The high capacity of strategic-structural plans to adapt to complicated and changeable social and economic conditions has been proven. But implementation of these plans needs at least a basic foundation in science, theory, economics, law, finance, and administration. Until such preconditions materialize, implementation of a plan with a strategic stance is impossible.
