= Susan Fainstein =

American university teacher (born 1938)

- Born: Susan Saltzman; September 27, 1938 (age 88)
- Occupation: Educator
- Spouse(s): Roger Bove (divorced); Norman Fainstein
- Children: Eric Bove; Paul Bove

Academic background
- Education: Harvard University; Boston University; Massachusetts Institute of Technology
- Thesis: The Movement for Community Control of Schools in New York City (1971)

Academic work
- Institutions: Harvard University
- Notable works: The Just City (2010); “The City Builders” (2001)

Susan Saltzman Fainstein (born September 27, 1938) is an American educator and scholar of urban planning. Fainstein is currently a Senior Research Fellow at the Harvard University Graduate School of Design, where she had previously been a professor of urban planning. Her research and writing has focused on the distributive effects of urban development strategies and megaprojects, the role of democracy and community control in local public institutions, and establishing a moral theory of "the just city."

A member of the urban planning faculties of Columbia University and Rutgers University for most of her career, Fainstein is now a research scholar at the Harvard Graduate School of Design.

== Work ==
=== Economic restructuring and urban development ===
Conducting field research in New York and London, Fainstein has studied the rise of "pro-growth" municipal regimes and accelerated real estate development since 1980. Her work charts the growth of public-private partnerships in urban development and increasing reliance on property development as a wholesale economic development strategy. Noting that property-focused growth has weakened urban welfare programs and broad neighborhood revitalization strategies, she has proposed reforms to public-private partnership structures that discourage overbuilding and permit broader community benefits.

=== Theory of the "Just City" ===
Since 1999 Fainstein has worked to theorize the "just city," a concept for which her 2010 book is named. Fainstein argues that urban planners need a normative theory of justice because their enthusiasm for social and built-environment diversity has not produced alternatives to inequality under pro-growth regimes. She maintains that the dominant "communicative planning" paradigm—in which sufficiently inclusive and deliberative planning procedures are said to yield just outcomes—cannot produce just outcomes. This is because they cannot resolve structural inequalities among actors, settle rival concepts of the public good, or account for progressive policies achieved in non-deliberative democratic societies. Because of these limitations, planning procedures permit outcomes incompatible with justice such as greater economic inequality, marginalization of social groups, and political domination.

Fainstein proposes an urban theory of justice in which "equity, "democracy," and diversity are the first-order concerns of urban development, with equity prevailing when such outcomes conflict. These principles aim to harmonize the contractarian "theory of justice" proposed by John Rawls with its post-liberal criticisms, particularly those of Iris Marion Young, who argues that the recognition of social group differences cannot be subordinated to individual distributive fairness. To reconcile tradeoffs among these priorities, Fainstein endorses the "capabilities approach" of Amartya Sen and Martha Nussbaum: all three norms must be upheld sufficiently such that they can be achieved by all moral subjects, while allowing subjects to choose priority among these basic principles.

Fainstein has upheld Amsterdam's social housing program as a model of the "just city" paradigm because it supports a mix of household types, permits ethnic concentration but not enclavism, and safeguards a basic living standard. Other scholars have argued that liberalizing structural reforms since 1980 have eroded the program's claims to provide housing equity and social diversity.

The topic has been engaged widely by planners and urban theorists since its introduction. Peter Marcuse and Oren Yiftachel have expanded on Fainstein's justice concept, calling for greater focus on property relations and recognition of planning paradigms outside the U.S. and Europe. More critical reception has come from urban geographer David Harvey who, extending his Marxist critique of urban planning, has argued that "just city" theory does not remedy the inherent injustices of capitalist urbanization but instead palliates them. Fainstein has responded that the approach attempts what is feasible within capitalist development and does not "depend on revolutionary change."

== Personal life ==
Fainstein is married to urban sociology professor Norman I. Fainstein, who served previously as dean of arts and sciences at Baruch College in the City University of New York, dean of the faculty at Vassar College, and president of Connecticut College. In Fall 2019, Fainstein and her husband are co-teaching on "History and Theory of Urban Interventions" at the Harvard Graduate School of Design. She has two sons, Eric Bove and Paul Bove, and three grandchildren.

== Sources ==
- Harvey, David; Potter, Cuz (2009). "The Right to the Just City". In Marcuse, Peter; Connolly, James; Novy, Johannes; Olivo, Ingrid; Potter, Cuz; Steil, Justin (eds.). Searching for the Just City. London: Routledge. pp. 40–51.
- Marcuse, Peter (2009). "From "Justice Planning" to "Commons Planning"". In Marcuse, Peter; Connolly, James; Novy, Johannes; Olivo, Ingrid; Potter, Cuz; Steil, Justin (eds.). Searching for the Just City. London: Routledge. pp. 91–102.
- Mayer, Margit; Novy, Johannes (2009). "As "Just" As It Gets? The European City in the "Just City" Discourse". In Marcuse, Peter; Connolly, James; Novy, Johannes; Olivo, Ingrid; Potter, Cuz; Steil, Justin (eds.). Searching for the Just City. London: Routledge. pp. 103–115.
- Uitermark, Justus (2012). "An Actually Existing Just City? The Fight for the Right to the City in Amsterdam". In Brenner, Neil; Marcuse, Peter; Mayer, Margit (eds.). Cities for People, Not for Profit: Critical Urban Theory and the Right to the City. London and New York: Routledge. pp. 197–214.
- Yiftachel, Oren; Goldhaber, Ravit; Nuriel, Roy (2009). "Urban Justice and Recognition: Affirmation and Hostility in Beer Sheva". In Marcuse, Peter; Connolly, James; Novy, Johannes; Olivo, Ingrid; Potter, Cuz; Steil, Justin (eds.). Searching for the Just City. London: Routledge. pp. 120–143.

== Selected works ==
=== Books ===
- Fainstein, Norman I.; Fainstein, Susan S. (1974). Urban Political Movements: The Search for Power by Minority Groups in American Cities. Englewood Cliffs, NJ: Prentice-Hall. ISBN 9780139393303.
- Fainstein, Susan; Fainstein, Norman I. (1972). The View from Below: Urban Politics and Social Policy. Boston: Little, Brown & Company.
- Fainstein, Susan; Fainstein, Norman I.; Child Hill, Richard; Judd, Dennis; Smith, Michael P. (1983). Restructuring the City: the Political Economy of Urban Redevelopment, revised edit 1986. New York: Longman. ISBN 9780582282933.
- Fainstein, Susan (1990). Urban Economic Development and the Transformation of Planning in the United States and Great Britain. Piscataway, NJ: Center for Urban Policy Research.
- Fainstein, Susan (1994). The City Builders: Property, Politics, and Planning in London and New York. Cambridge, MA: Blackwell Publishers. ISBN 9780631182436.
- Fainstein, Susan (2010). The Just City. Ithaca, NY: Cornell University Press.

=== Edited volumes ===
- Fainstein, Norman I.; Fainstein, Susan S., eds. (1982). Urban Policy under Capitalism. Beverly Hills, CA: Sage Publications.
- Fainstein, Susan S.; Gordon, Ian; Harloe, Michael, eds. (1996). Divided Cities: New York & London in the Contemporary World. Cambridge, MA: Blackwell Publishers.
- Judd, Dennis R.; Fainstein, Susan S., eds. (1999). The Tourist City. New Haven: Yale University Press. ISBN 9780300074055.
- Hoffman, Lily M.; Fainstein, Susan S.; Judd, Dennis R., eds. (2003). Cities and Visitors: Regulating People, Markets, and City Space. Cambridge, MA: Blackwell Publishers. ISBN 9781405100588.
- Carmon, Naomi; Fainstein, Susan S., eds. (2013). Policy, Planning, and People: Promoting Justice in Urban Development. Philadelphia: University of Pennsylvania Press. ISBN 9780812207965.
- Campbell, Scott; Fainstain, Susan S., eds. (1996). Readings in Planning Theory. Cambridge, MA: Blackwell Publishers.
- Fainstein, Susan; Campbell, Scott, eds. (1996). Readings in Urban Theory. Cambridge, MA: Blackwell Publishers.
- Fainstein, Susan; Servon, Lisa, eds. (2005). Gender and Planning: A Reader. New Brunswick, NJ: Rutgers University Press.

=== Journal articles ===
- Fainstein, Norman I.; Fainstein, Susan S. (1976). "The Future of Community Control". American Political Science Review. 70 (3): 905–923. doi:10.2307/1959874. ISSN 1537-5943. JSTOR 1959874. S2CID 145684270.
- Fainstein, Norman I.; Fainstein, Susan S. (1979). "New debates in urban planning". International Journal of Urban and Regional Research. 3 (1–4): 381–403. doi:10.1111/j.1468-2427.1979.tb00796.x. ISSN 1468-2427.
- Fainstein, Susan S.; Fainstein, Norman I. (1985). "Economic Restructuring and the Rise of Urban Social Movements". Urban Affairs Review. 21 (2): 187–206. doi:10.1177/004208168502100204. ISSN 1078-0874. S2CID 154706183.
- Fainstein, Norman I.; Fainstein, Susan S. (1987). "Economic Restructuring and the Politics of Land Use Planning in New York City". Journal of the American Planning Association. 53 (2): 237–248. doi:10.1080/01944368708976658. ISSN 0194-4363.
- Fainstein, Susan S.; Fainstein, Norman I. (1989). "The Racial Dimension in Urban Political Economy". Urban Affairs Review. 25 (2): 187–199. doi:10.1177/004208168902500201. ISSN 1078-0874. S2CID 154845856.
- Fainstein, Susan S. (1991). "Promoting Economic Development Urban Planning in the United States and Great Britain". Journal of the American Planning Association. 57 (1): 22–33. doi:10.1080/01944369108975469. ISSN 0194-4363.
- Fainstein, Susan S. (2000). "New Directions in Planning Theory". Urban Affairs Review. 35 (4): 451–478. doi:10.1177/107808740003500401. S2CID 18698244.
- Fainstein, Susan S. (2001). "Competitiveness, Cohesion, and Governance: Their Implications for Social Justice". International Journal of Urban and Regional Research. 25 (4): 884–888. doi:10.1111/1468-2427.00349. ISSN 1468-2427.
- Fainstein, Susan S. (2001). "Inequality in Global City-Regions". The Planning Review. 37 (144): 20–25. doi:10.1080/02513625.2001.10556764. ISSN 0251-3625. S2CID 153452413.
- Fainstein, Susan (2005). "Cities and Diversity Should We Want It? Can We Plan For It?". Urban Affairs Review. 41 (1): 3–19. doi:10.1177/1078087405278968. ISSN 1078-0874. S2CID 54209112.
- Fainstein, Susan S. (2008). "Mega-projects in New York, London and Amsterdam". International Journal of Urban and Regional Research. 32 (4): 768–785. doi:10.1111/j.1468-2427.2008.00826.x. ISSN 1468-2427.

=== Book chapters ===
- Fainstein, Susan (1999). "Can We Make the Cities We Want?". In Body-Gendrot, Sophie; Beauregard, Robert (eds.). The Urban Moment. Thousand Oaks: Sage. pp. 249–72.
- Fainstein, Susan (2009). "Planning and the Just City". In Marcuse, Peter; Connolly, James; Novy, Johannes; Olivo, Ingrid; Potter, Cuz; Steil, Justin (eds.). Searching for the Just City. London: Routledge. pp. 19–39.
