= Ancient Chinese urban planning =

How cities were built in the East Asian country before the modern period

Ancient Chinese urban planning encompasses the diverse set of cultural beliefs, social and economic structures, and technological capacities that influenced urban design in the early period of Chinese civilization. Factors that have shaped the development of Chinese urbanism include: fengshui, and astronomy; the well-field system; the cosmological belief that Heaven is round, and the Earth is square, the concept of qi (气; 氣); political power shared between a ruling house and educated advisers; the holy place bo; a three-tiered economic system under state control; early writing; and the walled capital city as a diagram of political power.

== Early development of China ==
Urban planning originated during the urbanization of the Yellow River valley in the Neolithic Age, which began in China around 10,000 B.C. and concluded with the introduction of metallurgy about 8,000 years later, was characterized by the development of settled communities that relied primarily on farming and domesticated animals rather than hunting and gathering. The process in China, as elsewhere in the world, is related to the process of centralizing power in a political state. Although several cultures formed competing states, the direct ancestor of the Chinese state was Longshan culture. Therefore, the earliest Chinese urban planning was a synthesis of Longshan traditional cosmology, geomancy, astrology, and numerology. This synthesis generated a diagram of the cosmos, which placed man, state, nature, and heaven in harmony. The city was planned in the context of this cosmic diagram to maintain harmony and balance.

=== Neolithic Age urbanization ===
Yangshao and Longshan Culture

Urbanization begins at Banpo (4,800–3,750 BC) on the Zhongyuan plain of the Yellow River. Banpo grew from a typical Yangshao village in both size and organization until the construction of the Great Hall ca. 4000 BC. Like Eridu in Mesopotamia, Banpo in East Asia was the first instance of specialized architecture, something other than a house. Physically, Banpo was composed of 200 round pit-houses and the Great Hall across 5 hectares and surrounded by a ditch. These pit houses were sited for solar gain by aligning the door to the Yingshi (营室; 營室; yíngshì, or simply shi 室) asterism just after the winter solstice. Already, at this early stage the principle of south-facing entry was firmly established.

As in other Neolithic communities, life at Banpo was synchronized to the agricultural year, which was timed by the movement of the Big Dipper, which functioned as a celestial clock. The Classic of Poetry describes this annual cycle. Beginning in spring, adolescents swam through the flood waters at the triangular confluence of two rivers. They emerged shivering, and in this state they were infused with the souls of ancestors buried in the earth who had reemerged at the springs of the Yellow River. In this energized state, they procreated in a location deemed to possess magical earth energy. These locations were unsuitable for agriculture, usually a hill, and therefore were uncleared primeval forests. Consecrated procreation was essential to maintaining the cycle of life. When the flood waters receded, the triangle was divided into fields between the families. In autumn there was a large festival at the completion of the harvest. In winter, the men left their homes and retired to the Great Hall, where they were led by the village elders in drinking and singing to repel the cold.

The needs and beliefs of Banpo society contributed significantly to the development of the early Chinese urban form. Sacred procreation sites from the springtime rituals eventually became known as the Holy Place, referred to as bo (verify spelling). Additionally, the concept of the relationship between ancestors, the earth, and fertility laid the groundwork for the theory of qi energy and fengshui geomancy. This idea is elaborated in the Book of Burial, which describes the notion of qi (气; 氣, literally 'vital energy' or 'atmosphere') as a fundamental force. In this theory, humans are seen as concentrated qi, and when their bones are returned to the earth, they are re-energized by qi. The descendants of the deceased are affected by the qi generated from the bones of their ancestors, similar to how the vibration of one lute string can influence another nearby string.

This philosophy suggests that the world is an active matrix of qi, and for harmony to be maintained, graves, houses, and cities must be carefully positioned according to fengshui principles. The cosmological model that guided this idea described the world as having a round heaven and a square earth. This cosmological view, known as gaitian cosmology (盖天说; 蓋天說, literally 'canopy-heavens theory'), originated from Neolithic Chinese astronomy. The cosmic diagram is often depicted on jade bi (a flat disc) and cong (a cylindrical object), which were used to communicate with sky and earth spirits, respectively. In particular, Yangshao pottery decorated with a pattern representing the Big Dipper on a nine-in-one square (earth) surrounded by a circle (heaven) illustrates a cosmological worldview of earth divided into nine parts. Over time, this model of the nine-in-one square served as the basis for the well-field system, a fundamental and geometric concept used in urban planning. Similarly, the design of the Great Hall would later serve as a model for the palaces and imperial cities of China. Longshan Culture (3000–2000 BC) arrived from the east one thousand years after Banpo in the same area. This arrival is mythologized by the story of the Yellow Emperor, a man of vigorous energy who dispensed law, standardized measures, invented writing, and conquered. The Longshan tribes formed a superstratum over Yangshao culture. As they fused ideologically and socially, all the elements of a new state and civilization appeared. Culturally, protowriting in the form of the Longshan Script was used on oracle bones. Politically, a Longshan warlord ruled with the help of a Yangshao adviser. Both the use of oracle bones, and the rule of a king with adviser, had continuity into the Shang dynasty. The first capital was Chengziya in 2500 BC, followed by Taosi in 2300 BC and finally by Erlitou in 2000 BC. Longshan Culture developed directly into the Xia and Shang dynasties.

The hierarchical and militaristic aspects of Longshan culture are evident in their cities. Their shape is a walled square filled with square houses. The transition from round to square homes is always accompanied by centralizing power in history. The square shaped city, itself a product of centralized power, historically arises from a military encampment. It is the city as a diagram of political power. The new order made its mark on the Urban-Regional context. Three levels of settlement emerged in the early Longshan state, village called Jū (0–1 ha), city Yi (1–5 ha), and capital called Dū (<5 ha). These three tiers of settlements are the physical realization of central place theory. The original Yangshao Jū villages formed a matrix of production that channeled goods upward to larger Longshan Yi and ultimately to the Dū. Political power was therefore defined as the amount of the highly productive matrix of agriculture and villages under control. The greater the area, the more wealth passed upwards to the capital. Other cities were economically unnecessary, as there were neither long-distance trade nor markets.

The final Longshan capital, Erlitou is the physical manifestation of massive social change in China c 2000 BC. Erlitou began in the Neolithic as a Yangshao bo, with later additions of altars and temples. It was a sacred city, even when absorbed by the Longshan tribes, and thus was never walled. Erlitou was the site of transition into the Bronze Age. The legendary Xia dynasty may have been the ruling class of Erlitou.

=== Bronze Age urbanization ===
Erlitou is sited at the confluence of the Luo and Yi rivers, a sacred place known as the Waste of Xia. Geographically, the Waste of Xia marked the center of the nine-in-one square earth. During the transitional Erlitou Culture, diverse Neolithic traditions were woven into one coherent harmonious philosophical and political system. In this system, earth was the mirror of heaven ruled by the Jade Emperor. Residing in Polaris, he sent the heavenly breath of qi down to earth through meridians. The qi concentrated in mountains and rivers, and by informed site planning a building and even a city could fit into this energized matrix. Politically, qi flowed from heaven through earth into and the through the divine emperor, through his city, and out of the gates into his realm. The emperor kept heaven and earth in harmonious balance through his absolute power. An adviser class interpreted the omens of heaven to inform his actions.

The nine states

Geographically, the state was believed to be square-shaped and centered on the ruler. As described in the Book of Documents, China is a square of 45,000 li with five nested squares spaced at 500 li to create five zones. Beginning at the center, Royal Domain (500 x 500 li), Noble Domain, Domain of Peace-Securing, Domain of Restraint, and Wild Domain. Outside the fifth zone, the barbarian tribes lived. The Xia and early Shang palace was a miniature diagram of this cosmos. It had a traditional Longshan square shape oriented strictly north–south since qi flows that direction. This square was further subdivided into nine parts based on the now ancient nine-in-one square, which had become a prosperity symbol. A rectilinear walled settlement for servants and craftsmen formed around this palace.

The nine-in-one square was transformed into the Holy Field symbol, sometime during the Shang dynasty. In a myth the founder of the Xia dynasty, Yu the Great, received the Holy Field symbol from a magical turtle sent by heaven. Its importance cannot be underestimated as it is the geometric basis of ancient Chinese architecture, urban planning, and geography. By the time of the Xia dynasty, the nine-in-one square territory of earth was divided into nine states (Chinese: 九州; pinyin: Jiǔzhōu).

Although an important stage in urbanization, Erlitou was not a true city. It was a palace complex surrounded by an oversized Neolithic village. During the Bronze Age, expensive bronze artifacts belonged exclusively to the aristocracy, and the peasants still lived at a neolithic level of development. There was a succession of these palatial du capitals during the Xia and into the Early Shang dynasties. Each successive capital had a higher level of development until the Late Shang capital Yin. Yin was the first true city and represented the culmination of Longshan Culture. The design of the palace at Yin was copied by the Zhou dynasty to create the palace at Zhouyuan, which consolidated all the addition and experimentation of Yin over centuries. Although a copy, Zhouyuan was innovative for its high level of planning. This feature of Zhou urbanism would later be implemented on a national scale. Politically, the Zhou tribe, a vassal of the Shang dynasty, moved through a series of three capitals, Fan, Bo, and Shen, before settling at their ancestral capital, Zhouyuan on the Weishui River.

=== Iron Age urbanization ===
As China moved into the Iron Age the control of the Zhou over their empire dissolved into multiple states. This period, called the Eastern Zhou dynasty, was a time of great urbanization in China. Chengzhou became the political capital of the Eastern Zhou in 510 BC (its fortification tripled in width). The cities lost the rank to size hierarchy imposed by Zhou authority and grew according to their economic and military functions. This period, although politically chaotic, was a great period of urbanization and experimentation with architecture and urban planning.

Along with the growth of cities, there was a parallel growth of urban society; independent merchants, artisans, scholars, and the like all emerged as a new social class at this time. In addition to the growth in the Yellow River Valley, the Yangtze River Valley began to urbanize under the cultural model of the Zhou dynasty. The cities of states such as Wu, Yue, Chu, and Shu had regional variations. By the time of the Qin dynasty conquest there was a great diversity of wealthy cities across China, excluding the Lingnan region.

The city marketplace with tower was a new feature of this era that marked the beginning of an integrated economic function of cities. The architecture of the warring states featured high walls, large gates, and towers. The development of the tower as a symbol of power and social order especially defined this era. The tower usually projected outward at the top to create an image of strength and intimidation. The new marketplace was always overlooked by a tower.

Capitals of China (3000–700 BC)
rank	pinyin	Chinese	date	size	population	location	dynasty	note
1	Chéngzǐyá	城子崖	2500–256 BC	20 ha	10,000	36.7358°N 117.35415°E	PreDynastic (Longshan)	none
2	Táosì	陶寺	2300–1900 BC	3 ha	?	35.896667°N 111.496111°E	PreDynastic (Longshan)	none
4	Yángchéng	陽城	2188–2146 BC	30 ha	?	Wangchenggang site in Gaocheng township Dengfeng County, Henan 34.396488°N 113.133596°E	Xia	also: Ji
5	Dìqiū	帝丘	2146 BC	? ha	?	Puyang, Henan	Xia	also: Shangqiu (predynastic Shang Capital)
6	Yuán	原	2079–2057 BC	? ha	?	Jiyuan, Henan	Xia	none
7	Lǎoqiū	老丘	2057–1900 BC	? ha	?	Kaifeng, Henan	Xia	none
8	Xīhé	西河	1900–1879 BC	? ha	?	Tangyin, Henan	Xia	also: Bi
9	Ānyì	安邑	? BC	? ha	?	Xiaxian, Shanxi	Xia	also: Xiayi
10	Píngyáng	平陽	? BC	? ha	?	Linfen, Shanxi	Xia	none
11	Zhēnxún	斟鄩	2100–1500 BC	300 ha	?	Zhenxun, Erlitou, Henan 34.701759°N 112.697079°E	Xia	二里头; 二里頭; Èrlǐtóu
12	Jìnyáng	晉陽	? BC	? ha	?	Taiyuan, Shanxi	Xia	none
13	Xībó	西亳	1766–1552 BC	20 ha	?	Shixianggou Township, Yanshi County, Luoyang, Henan 34.716106°N 112.763191°E	Shang	also: Bo of Tang, Yanshi, Henan
14	Áo	隞	1562–1549 BC	400 ha	?	Zhengzhou, Henan 34.748968°N 113.683774°E	Shang	also: Xiao
15	Xiāng	相	1534–1525 BC	? ha	?	Neihuang, Henan	Shang	none
16	Xíng	邢	1525–1506 BC	? ha	?	Xingtai, Hebei	Shang	also: Xiang
17	Bì	庇	1510–1420 BC	? ha	?	Yuncheng, Shandong	Shang	none
18	Yǎn	奄	1321 BC	? ha	?	Qufu, Shandong	Shang	none
19	Yīn	殷	1299–1050 BC	300 ha	?	Anyang, Shaanxi 36°07′17″N 114°19′01″E	Shang	also: Beimeng
20	Zhōuyuán	周原	1158–771 BC	? ha	?	Xi'an, Shanxi 34.497520°N 107.842903°E	Zhou	destroyed by Rong people
21	Fēng-Hǎo	豐鎬	1066–1036 BC	? ha	?	Xi'an, Shanxi 34.250241°N 108.751428°E	Zhou	also: Zongzhou (宗周)
22	Chéngzhōu	成周	1036–1021 BC	? ha	?	Luoyang, Henan 34.716592°N 112.620086°E	Zhou	post-dynastyic capitals: Zhou Ge, Bo, Gu, and Yidu
23	Wángchéng	王城	1021–771 BC	? ha	?	Luoyang, Henan 34.667484°N 112.417719°E	Zhou	also: Luoyi (洛邑)

== Classical Standard ==
The Holy Field Symbol
	4	9	2
	3	5	7
	8	1	6
original diagram	modern notation		

Plan of Chengzhou (supergrid in red)

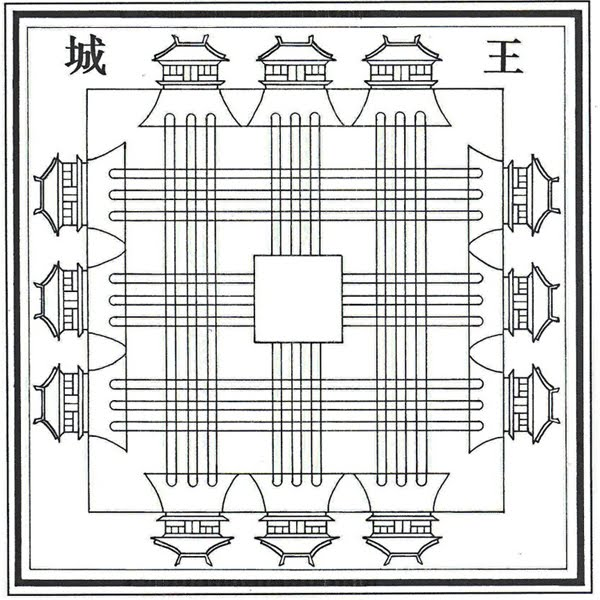
Plan of Chengzhou from the 1175 Song-era Xinding Sanlitu

During the Warring States and Han, the beginnings of a classical textual tradition of city planning developed. Although there is little direct evidence that any classical text exerted an important influence on urban design until the late imperial period, the texts themselves have a much longer history. While some important literary evidence concerning Zhou urban construction can be found in the Classic of Poetry and the Book of Documents, during the Han dynasty a text emerged that would later become the locus classicus of the ideal imperial capital.

This text, the Kaogongji, is a description of craftsmen's techniques that includes two sections on city construction. It is a late addition to the Rites of Zhou one of three ritual classics canonized during the Han. The Rites of Zhou is a blueprint for governmental administration divided into six offices representing Heaven, Earth, and each of the four seasons. The section for the Offices of Winter, a bureau charged with the oversight of public works, was lost sometime before or during the Qin to Han transition. During the Western Han, the Kaogongji was added as a replacement.

The first section on urban construction in the Kaogongji describes ancient techniques for siting a city, including methods for precisely orienting the site to the cardinal directions and determining the levelness of the land. The second section describes the basic features of the ideal capital city:

The carpenters construct the capital city, which is a square of nine li on each side. On each side there are three gates. Within the city there are nine north-south and nine east-west roads; the north-south roads are as wide as nine carriages side by side. The ancestral temple of the ruling house is to the left of the palace, the temple to god of the soil is to the right. The palace faces the court in front and the market is behind it. The court and the market are both one fu in area.

This section goes on to describe the structure and dimensions of important buildings (as well as their historical precedents), and the heights of the towers surmounting the palace, inner city wall, and outer city wall.

There are several cosmologically significant features of this basic urban outline, including cardinal orientation, square shape, (implied) centrality of the ruler's palace, grid structure, and the prominence of the number nine. The nine-by-nine grid has led some scholars to suggest that the plan is based on the cosmological belief that the Earth is a square divided into nine sections. This structure is reproduced by the magic square, a tool for divination.

Although the Kaogongji does not explicitly identify this model with any historical city, it has been traditionally associated with Chengzhou, a city built by the Duke of Zhou soon after the Zhou conquest of the Shang. The “Proclamation at Luo,” a chapter of the Book of Documents, describes how the Duke of Zhou traveled to Luo (near the site of present-day Luoyang) to establish a secondary capital for the new Zhou dynasty, further solidify the Zhou receipt of the Mandate of Heaven, and relocate the former subjects of the defeated Shang.

== Imperial Era ==
The imperial era of urban planning was marked by an attempt to extend imperial authority uniformly across China by creating an economic and political urban hierarchy. In the Han, this integration was imagined as the resurrection of an idealized memory of the golden age of the Zhou dynasty. Each province was divided into prefectures and each prefecture into counties. The network of imperial administrative cities was overlaid on an existing network of unwalled villages and townships. One county therefore ruled over several townships and many more villages. At the apex of this administrative hierarchy was a new creation, the imperial capital.

=== Formation ===
Historically, the cities of the Seven Warring States were combined into one unified regional system under the Qin dynasty unification of China. Also under the Qin dynasty Chengzhou lost its status and was renamed Luoyang in 236 BC. The Qin dynasty destroyed most of the Eastern Zhou urbanization to concentrate its collected wealth at the capital Xianyang. Colonization of the Lingnan and Ordos regions began at this time, using a modified version of the Zhou classical standard of urban design. The Qin created a national system of military garrisons on a three-tier administrative hierarchy as a practical measure to control the population according to strict legalistic principles. The Qin soon lost power in a revolt and were replaced by the Han dynasty, who continued many aspects the Qin system of imperial administration, including its system of laws.

At its inception, the Han dynasty was immediately faced with the task of rebuilding the urban infrastructure which had been destroyed by Qin dynasty purges and the war of succession after its downfall. According to the Records of the Grand Historian, Gaozu, the Han founder, initially desired to establish the new capital at Luoyang, the former site of Chengzhou, in order to associate the Han with the illustrious early Zhou. However, it was ultimately decided that the new capital, Chang'an, should be built near the old Qin capital at Xianyang.

=== The County ===
During the Han dynasty official administration extended only to the county level. The county (县; 縣; xiàn) was the primary unit of government control which harnessed the productive power of the villages in its area of control to concentrate wealth. The county was thus a city-state in function with two parts; a walled settlement 1×1 li at the geographical center of the territory. The city had no name of its own, it was named by adding the suffix -cheng (城) to the county's name. The territory of the county was divided into districts called townships (乡; 鄉/鄕; xiāng) which were subdivided into villages (村; cūn). Villages generally had a population of 100. Currently the village level is the lowest level of administration in China. These local units, counties, were collected in groups of 8–10 called prefectures, and the prefectures were gathered in groups of 12–16 to form provinces. Economically, the county was a market for productive countryside, which consisted not only of agriculture, but also townships and villages of people to work the land and produce goods by cottage industry. The county extended military control over a segment of this productive matrix and was the entry point for goods to channel upward to the Imperial City. There were approximately 1500 counties in China proper. This economic structure was later modified by commercial towns in the Middle Ages.

A county was controlled by a magistrate in a walled complex in the walled county center. He was responsible for tax collection, justice, postal service, police, granaries, salt stores, social welfare, education, and religious ceremony. The magistrate's complex (yamen) was sited at the center of this the city at the point where the main east–west street crossed the main north–south street. The main entrance was in the south and axially aligned along the main north south street connecting to the south gate of the walls. Two arches on the east west street marked the entry forming a small plaza. The south side of the plaza was a dragon wall and the north was the main gate of the compound. This gate lead to a courtyard passing through this courtyard to another gate, called the gate of righteousness, lead to the main courtyard of the complex. The north side of this courtyard was the central hall where the magistrate worked the two side halls contained the six offices. Behind the central hall was another courtyard and hall where the magistrate met with higher-ranking officials. The three courtyard compound formed the center of the complex to the east west of it were other halls, offices, granaries, stables, libraries, official residences, and prisons.

=== Imperial city ===
The imperial capital was meant to exist outside of any one region, even the one it was physically located in. To achieve this it used a text based plan, a cult of heaven, forced migration, and symbolization of the city as the Emperor. The evolution of the imperial capital occurred in three stages, first the super-regional capital on Xianyang, followed by the semi-regional and semi-textual capital of Chang'an, and finally fully realized in the fully textual capital of Luoyang. The capital city of the Western Han dynasty, Chang'an, was built to exceed its predecessor, Xianyang. Luoyang, the capital of the Eastern Han dynasty, would in turn become the model of all future imperial cities.

As the empire was divided into counties prefectures and provinces

Summary of Regional and Urban Economic Hierarchy
Economic Rank	Urban			Rural		
1. Regional City	capital	jīng	京	Nation	guó	國
2. Local City	provincial capital	dū	都	province	zhōu	州
3. Central Market	city	shì	市	prefecture	jùn	郡
4. Middle Market	district	fāng	坊	county	xiān	縣
5. Standard Market	subdistrict	pái	牌	township	xiāng	鄕
6. Commune	neighborhood	hútòng	胡同	village	cūn	村
7. Household	block	qū	區	compound	sìhéyuàn	四合院

== Neoclassical Standard ==
It is uncertain to what extent the planners of early and medieval Chinese cities consciously took the Kaogongji as a model. Very little textual evidence preserves the motives and debates surrounding the construction of China's great pre-modern capitals. However, during the Ming (1346–1644) there was a close formal correspondence between the capital at Beijing and the Kaogongji model.

== See also ==
- Architecture of the Song dynasty
- Chinese city wall
- Chinese units of measurement
- History of the administrative divisions of China
- Paifang
- China Historical Geographic Information System
