= Urban studies =

Field within the social sciences

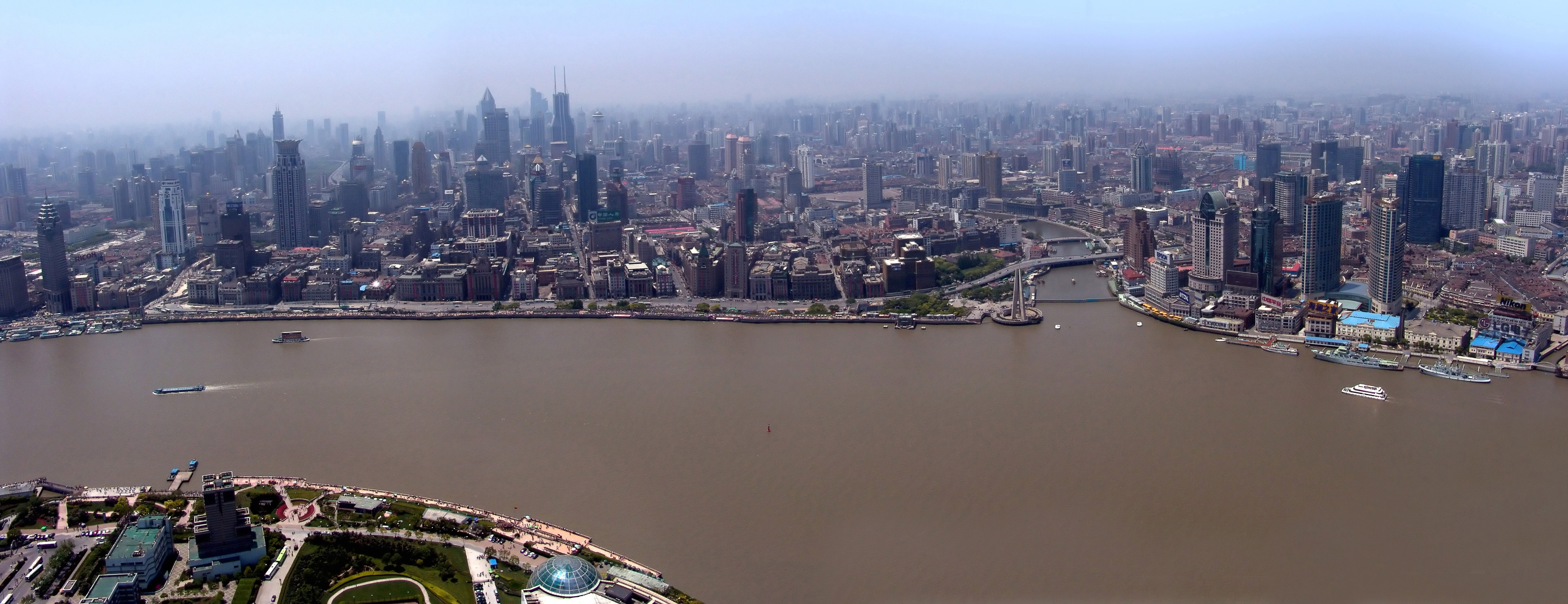
Shanghai, China from 2008

Urban studies is the transdisciplinary study of urban settlements and urban development—comprising the theory portion of the field of urban planning. Topics range from geography, sociology, anthropology, history, urban design and architecture, to public policy and politics, and their interrelations with community development. Urban studies is a major field of study used by practitioners of urban planning, it helps with the understanding of human values, development, and the interactions they have with their physical environment.

== History ==
The study of cities has changed dramatically from the 1800s over time, with new frames of analysis being applied to the development of urban areas. The first college programs were created to observe how cities were developed based on anthropological research of ghetto communities. In the mid-1900s, urban study programs expanded beyond just looking at the current and historical impacts of city design and began studying how those designs impacted the future interactions of people and how to improve city development through architecture, open spaces, the interactions of people, and different types of capital that form a community.

Urban history plays an important role in this field of study because it reveals how cities have developed previously. History plays a large role in determining how cities will change in the future. Such areas change continuously as part of larger processes and create new histories that researchers study on both large-scale and individual levels.

Overall, three different themes have influenced how researchers have and will continue to study urban areas:

1. Spatial structures: Reflect how the city is physically organized
2. Processes that support spatial structure: Question how the city's structure operates
3. Normative Analysis: Construct opinions supported by facts to promote better urban planning methods

Scholars have also researched how cities outside of the United Kingdom and the United States have developed, but only to a limited degree. Urban history previously focused mostly on how European and American cities developed over time, instead of focusing on how non-European cities developed. Additional geographic areas researched in this field include South Africa, Australia, Latin America, and India. This is changing as more research is performed in developing economies, leading to more contextual urban and infrastructural development in various parts of the world.

The racial segregation of urban residents in the United States has played an important role in developing this field. One program founded to research African-American urban residents, the Harvard-MIT Joint Center for Urban Studies, was founded in 1959 to study residential segregation and to support affected communities. More recently, studies related to race and urban life started to focus on ethnographic methods to study how individuals lived in relation to the city and their respective systems as a whole.

Israel Zangwill wrote one of the first books on the Ghettos of Europe and how they impacted the Jewish children that were descendants of the original residents, Children of the Ghetto (1892), he also wrote two other books about the European Ghettos. Louis Wirth was the next scholar to write about the Ghettos, he wrote about them from a sociological perspective. Louis Wirth and Roberts Ezra Park also became the first sociologists to publish about the immigrant neighbourhoods in America with suggestions on their future design. Roberts Ezra Park was a student of George Zimmel in Chicago. Other famous scholars that studied segregation, American Ghettos, and impoverished neighbourhoods include Du Bois (1903), Haynes (1913), Johnson (1943), Horace Cayton (1944), Kenneth Clark (1965), William Julius Wilson (1987).

== Areas of research ==
This field is transdisciplinary because it uses theories from a variety of academic fields and places them within an urban context. A wide variety of academic fields refers to the urban environment as a location studied, such as Environmental Studies, Economics, Geography, Public Health, and Sociology. However, scholars in this field research how specific elements contribute to how the city operates, such as how housing and transportation will change. In addition, researchers also study how residents interact within the city, such as how race and gender differences lead to social inequalities, or concentrated disadvantage in urban areas. Urban studies is a major field of study used by paraprofessional practitioners of urban planning.

== Criticism ==
Researchers struggle how to define basic terms precisely, such as how a city is defined, due to how the roles of cities change. Researchers must be careful in how they describe urban areas, as their work can be manipulated as positive elements for city boosters wanting to promote a specific city.

== See also ==
- Index of urban studies articles
- List of urban theorists
- Urban theory
- Urban ecology
- Urban economics
- Urban geography
- Urban planning
- Urban sociology
- Urban vitality
