= Montague Leverson =

British lawyer and physician (1830–1925)

Montague Richard Leverson
- Born: 2 March 1830; London
- Died: 26 September 1925 (aged 95)
- Occupations: Lawyer, writer

Montague Richard Leverson (2 March 1830 – 26 September 1925) was a British lawyer known for his diverse career and controversial views. Born in England, Leverson pursued a legal career before emigrating to the United States. In the US, he initially settled in Colorado, where he became a rancher, embracing the rugged frontier lifestyle. His legal expertise soon led him to California, where he continued his work as a lawyer and became involved in politics.

Leverson was a homeopathic physician, advocating for alternative medical practices at a time when conventional medicine was becoming more established. His medical views extended to a staunch opposition to vaccination, making him a prominent figure in the anti-vaccination movement. Leverson also denied the germ theory of disease, which posits that microorganisms are the cause of many diseases, a stance that placed him at odds with the scientific community of his time.

Throughout his life, Leverson's outspoken opinions and unconventional career path drew both support and criticism. He wrote extensively, contributing to various publications and participating in public debates on medical and legal issues. Leverson's legacy is a complex one, reflecting a blend of pioneering spirit and controversial positions.

Despite the contentious nature of some of his beliefs, Leverson remained a dedicated advocate for his causes until his death in 1925. His life story is a testament to the diverse and often contradictory currents of thought in the late 19th and early 20th centuries. Today, Leverson is remembered as a figure who embodied the challenges and dynamism of his era.

== Early life ==
He was born in London on 2 March 1830, the son of Montague Levyson and his wife Elizabeth. He was the brother of the diamond merchant George Bazett Colvin Leverson, and uncle of Ernest David Leverson, husband of Ada Leverson; his brother James was also a diamond merchant, and George and James became the managers of Pittar, Leverson & Co. His family was Jewish, but he abandoned kosher at age 18. He accidentally shot and killed the family's parlourmaid Priscilla Fitzpatrick while playing with a loaded gun. From 1852 to 1859 he was a sole practitioner as a patent agent in Bishopsgate, London, then going into partnership.

At this period Leverson was a supporter of the Association for Promoting Jewish Settlements in Palestine founded by Abraham Benisch in 1852. It also involved William Henry Black, and did not continue long. He read a paper to the first conference of the National Association for the Promotion of Social Science, in 1857, On the Outlines of Jurisprudence.

== Radical lawyer in London ==
The Orsini affair trials of Simon François Bernard and Edward Truelove in 1858 brought Leverson prominence as a radical lawyer, acting as solicitor for their defences, with Edward James as counsel. Luigi Pianciani dedicated his La Rome des Papes (1859) to Leverson.

Leverson was on good terms, he claimed, with Giuseppe Mazzini, Giuseppe Garibaldi, Louis Blanc and Victor Hugo. His brother George was involved in fundraising for Garibaldi: the New York Times in 1860 wrote that "George Leverson, the well-known advocate of the cause of liberty, and brother to the Solicitor in Dr. Bernard's and the Press Prosecution Defences, is Treasurer pro tem." for a London fund.

In 1861 the secularist Charles Bradlaugh became managing clerk in Leverson's legal practice. In November of that year, Leverson acted on behalf of Bradlaugh in a criminal libel case brought by Sydney Gedge, concerning a church rates issue. In 1862 an arrangement was made for Leverson to give Bradlaugh his articles as a solicitor. Subsequently, the business got into difficulties. Bradlaugh left in 1864. In 1865 Leverson was elected to the Council of the Reform League.

Accused of purloining clients' funds Leverson fled first to France, then to the USA. He left his wife Kate who created a finishing school in Germany and then filed for divorce in 1876. Divorce papers reveal her grounds for the divorce, rare at the time, included waving a loaded gun and introducing poison into the cocoa pot. She pre-deceased him and when he very much later returned to England in his 90's he lived in Bournemouth with his second wife Ethel Mary Charlton, a teacher half his age. They were visited by his daughter in law Emily, who found him charming. His re-naturalisation paper said he was of good character and perfect respectability.

== In the US ==
Giving evidence in 1869 to a committee of the House of Representatives on electoral fraud, Leverson stated that he had come to the US in January 1867, and had been admitted to the bar in the United States in May 1868. As he wrote to Andrew Johnson in August 1867, he arrived with a letter from Charles Francis Adams Sr. in London, attesting to Leverson's support for the Union during the American Civil War. He offered to advise the embattled Johnson. He gave evidence in the fraud matter against Tammany Hall and its practices in relation to naturalization. He himself was naturalized as a US citizen in 1867.

=== Rancher ===
From 1872 Leverson had a ranch in Douglas County, Colorado, near Larkspur, and lectured on political economy at Golden, Colorado.

Leverson involved himself in the Lincoln County War of 1878. He wrote to Carl Schurz in August 1878, describing the situation in Lincoln County. He wrote also to President Rutherford B. Hayes, suggesting that Samuel Beach Axtell should be removed as Governor of the New Mexico Territory. It appeared later that Leverson was angling to have himself appointed as Governor. He was mocked by The Santa Fe New Mexican.

On the ground, Leverson had a part in the release of John Chisum from the San Miguel County jail. Chisum was being held there in spring 1878, for the sake of a debt owed to Thomas B. Catron. In court, Catron was arguing for a writ of ne exeat. Leverson has been credited with bringing together Chisum's supporters, with the effect that he left jail on bail of $25,000, and the matter of the debt, related to meat packing business, was settled. In June, Judge Samuel A. Parks ruled that ne exeat could not be granted in New Mexico.

Ostensibly, Leverson had been invited to Lincoln, New Mexico by Juan Patrón, a member of the New Mexico Territorial Legislature in Santa Fe, and elected its Speaker in 1877. It has been said that he was already a business associate of Chisum. He represented himself in correspondence as interested in planting a substantial English colony in the lower Pecos valley, where Chisum's ranch lay, obstructed solely by a lack of law and order. His prolific letter-writing chose as targets influential figures of the Santa Fe Ring, such as Catron and Stephen Benton Elkins.

Frank Warner Angel, the Special Agent looking into the New Mexico violence, summed up Leverson as "knows 6 times as much as he can prove & 6 times more than anyone else", and identified him as a strong supporter of Alexander McSween.

=== In politics ===
Leverson in 1879 moved to San Francisco, where he worked as a lawyer. He was a member of the California State Assembly for the 12th district in 1883–1884. In California he encountered Henry George, around 1880. He presented himself as a political economist, and mentioned his 1876 primer on the topic, published in New York. He dropped the names of his English contacts William Ellis and John Stuart Mill; and stated that, now he had read George's Progress and Poverty (1879) to which Joseph LeConte had introduced him, he felt his primer should be rewritten. He became an advocate for Georgism.

At the Proportional Representation Congress in Chicago in 1893, Leverson spoke on "The Proxy System as a Means of Real Representation." He mentioned that such a system, on the model of a joint-stock company, was in his draft proposal for a constitution for Colorado State of 1875. For the moment, he supported a simpler proportional representation approach.

During the Philippine–American War, Leverson supported the American Anti-Imperialist League. On his own initiative, he wrote from Fort Hamilton to Emilio Aguinaldo, which allowed opponents to characterise the League as "seditious". Another letter, to Galicano Apacible, caused the League to claim he was not a member. He spoke at an anti-imperialist rally in Philadelphia in February 1900, and sent the text of his speech to Leo Tolstoy.

=== Anti-vaccination ===
In 1893 Leverson obtained a medical degree at Baltimore Medical College. He styled himself "Dr Leverson", and became a homeopathic physician and anti-vaccinator, speaking against vaccination in London in March 1908, with an introduction by letter from Sarah Newcomb Merrick.

Leverson was a germ theory denialist who opposed the views of Louis Pasteur. He became a supporter of Antoine Béchamp. He travelled to meet Béchamp in Paris, and attended his funeral in 1908. Leverson translated Béchamp's book Blood and Its Third Anatomical Element, in 1911. He was secretary of the Anti-Vaccination Society of America and President of the Brooklyn Anti-Compulsory Vaccination League. He was also an anti-vivisectionist.

The 1923 book by Ethel Douglas Hume, Béchamp or Pasteur?: A Lost Chapter in the History of Biology, was based on manuscripts by Leverson.

== Later life ==
Leverson returned to the United Kingdom in 1900, and regained British citizenship in 1922. He lived in Bournemouth.

== Works ==
Leverson published:

- Copyright and Patents; being an Investigation of the Principles of Legal Science applicable to Property in Thought (1854). It was provoked by a House of Lords decision in Jefferys v. Boosey on copyright and the common law a few months earlier. A decade later he stated that "It was to political economy we owe our reasons for permitted any right of property at all [...]".
- The Reformers' Reform Bill (1866), pamphlet on electoral law
- Common Sense: Or, First Steps in Political Economy (1876)
- Primer of Morals (1885)
- Thoughts on Institutions of the Higher Education (1893)
- Kligalefogs Yulopa e liko kanoms padisipön (1893)
- Inoculations and the Germ Theory of Disease (1911)
- Pasteur the Plagiarist: The Debt of Science to Béchamp (1911)

== Family ==
Leverson married Kate Hyam. Gerald Finzi was their grandson. The couple separated when he moved to the USA. In old age, around 80, he married again.
