= Antoine Béchamp =

French scientist (1816–1908)

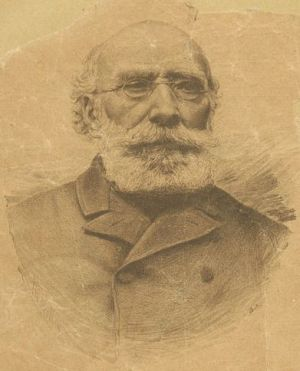
- Antoine Béchamp
- Born: 16 October 1816; Bassing, France
- Died: 15 April 1908 (aged 91); Paris, France
- Known for: Béchamp reaction Béchamp reduction
- Scientific career
- Fields: synthetic organic chemistry, biology

Pierre Jacques Antoine Béchamp (French pronunciation: [pjɛʁ ʒak ɑ̃twan beʃɑ̃]; 16 October 1816 – 15 April 1908) was a French scientist now best known for breakthroughs in synthetic organic chemistry and for an impassioned rivalry with Louis Pasteur.

Béchamp developed the Béchamp reduction, an inexpensive method to produce aniline dye, permitting William Henry Perkin to launch the synthetic-dye industry. Béchamp also synthesized the first organic arsenical drug, arsanilic acid, from which Paul Ehrlich later synthesized salvarsan, the first chemotherapeutic drug.

Béchamp's rivalry with Pasteur was initially for priority in attributing fermentation to microorganisms, later for attributing the silkworm disease pebrine to microorganisms, and eventually over the validity of germ theory.

Béchamp claimed to have discovered that the "molecular granulations" in biological fluids were actually the elementary units of life. He named them microzymas—that is, "tiny enzymes"—and credited them with producing both enzymes and cells while "evolving" amid favorable conditions into multicellular organisms. Béchamp also denied that bacteria could invade a healthy animal and cause disease, claiming instead that unfavorable host and environmental conditions destabilize the host's native microzymas and decompose host tissue by producing pathogenic bacteria.

While cell theory and germ theory gained widespread acceptance, granular theories have been rejected by current scientific consensus. Béchamp's version, microzymian theory, has been retained by small groups, especially in alternative medicine. His work in understanding how the "terrain" may affect disease may have implications in emerging microbiome research.

== Early life, family and education ==
Béchamp was born in Bassing, France in 1816, the son of a miller. He lived in Bucharest, Romania from the ages of 7 to 18 with an uncle who worked in the French ambassador's office. He was educated at the University of Strasbourg, receiving a doctor of science degree in 1853 and doctor of medicine in 1856, and ran a pharmacy in the city. In 1854 he was appointed Professor of Chemistry at the University of Strasbourg, a post previously held by Louis Pasteur.

== Career ==
In 1856, after receiving his medical degree, Béchamp took a position at the University of Montpellier, where he remained until 1876 when he was appointed Dean of the Catholic Faculty of Medicine at Université Lille Nord de France. Béchamp's time in Lille was stormy, as his dispute with Pasteur led to efforts to have his work placed on the Index Librorum Prohibitorum (the index of books prohibited by the Catholic Church). Béchamp retired under this cloud in 1886, briefly ran a pharmacy with his son, and ultimately moved to Paris, where he was given a small laboratory at the Sorbonne. One of his students was Victor Galippe, a physician who studied micro-organisms in plants and their role in human health. He died at the age of 91, his work having faded into scientific obscurity and Pasteur's version of germ theory dominant. A brief obituary in the British Medical Journal noted that Béchamp's name was "associated with bygone controversies as to priority which it would be unprofitable to recall."

In the modern day, Béchamp's work continues to be promoted by a small group of alternative medicine proponents (also known as germ theory denialists), including advocates of alternative theories of cancer, who dismiss Pasteur's germ theory and argue that Béchamp's ideas were unjustly ignored. They accused Pasteur, as did The French Academy of Sciences, of plagiarizing and then suppressing Béchamp's work, citing work such as Ethel Douglas Hume's Béchamp or Pasteur: A Lost Chapter in the History of Biology from the 1920s.

== Publications ==
Chronological list of Antoine Béchamp's principal books and treatises (original French editions and known English translations):

1852 – De l’alcohol et de sa fermentation — Early work on fermentation chemistry; Paris: Mallet-Bachelier.

1858 – Recherches sur la fermentation — Memoirs on fermentation processes; Paris: Mallet-Bachelier.

1869 – Mémoire sur la fermentation vineuse et sur la théorie de la fermentation — Paris: Gauthier-Villars.

1870 – La théorie du microzyma et la théorie cellulaire — Early exposition of his microzymian concept; Paris: Gauthier-Villars.

1874 – Les microzymas et leur rôle dans l’organisation, la nutrition et la régénération des êtres vivants et dans la fermentation — Paris: J.-B. Baillière et Fils.

1875 – La théorie du microzyma dans ses rapports avec la pathologie — Paris: J.-B. Baillière et Fils.

1875 – Les maladies dites virulentes et contagieuses — Paris: J.-B. Baillière et Fils.

1876 – La théorie de la fermentation exposée par les faits — Paris: J.-B. Baillière et Fils.

1883 – Les microzymas: la théorie du microzyma, foundationt de la biologie cellulaire et de la pathologie — Paris: J.-B. Baillière et Fils.

1883–1884 – Les causes des maladies infectieuses — Paris: J.-B. Baillière et Fils.

1884 – La vie et ses conditions — Paris: J.-B. Baillière et Fils.

1886 – Du sang et de son troisième élément — Paris: J.-B. Baillière et Fils.

=== Known English editions ===
1912 – The Blood and Its Third Element, translated by Montague R. Leverson; London: J.M. Dent & Sons.

1940s–1950s – The Third Element of the Blood (Health Research reprint, California).

1970 – The Blood and Its Third Element (Health Science Press reprint, Sussex).

Secondary English compilations or summaries (20th century):

- The Blood and Its Third Element and Microzymas: The Real Cause of Disease (Health Research, 1965).
- Microzymas: The Origin of Life (Health Research, 1970; compilation of excerpts).

=== Later English editions ===
The Blood and Its Third Element is the last book ever written by Bechamp discussing his scientific theories. It was republished in English by A Distant Mirror in 2020.

== Literature ==
- Buiuc, D.; Pânzaru, C. (2008). "Antoine Béchamp and Victor Cornil Memento for Romanian pharmacy, chemistry and medicine". Revista medico-chirurgicală a Societății de Medici și Naturaliști din Iași (in Romanian). 112 (2): 560–566. PMID 19295038.

== See also ==
- Pleomorphism (microbiology)
- Terrain theory
