= History of urban planning =

Urban planning is a technical and political process concerned with the use of land and design of the urban environment, including air, water, and the infrastructure passing into and out of urban areas such as transportation and distribution networks.

The history of urban planning runs parallel to the history of the city, as planning is in evidence at some of the earliest known urban sites.

== Prehistory ==
The pre-Classical and Classical periods saw a number of cities laid out according to fixed plans, though many tended to develop organically. Designed cities were characteristic of the Minoan, Mesopotamian, Harrapan, and Egyptian civilisations of the third millennium BC (see Urban planning in ancient Egypt). The first recorded description of urban planning appears in the Epic of Gilgamesh: "Go up on to the wall of Uruk and walk around. Inspect the foundation platform and scrutinise the brickwork. Testify that its bricks are baked bricks, And that the Seven Counsellors must have laid its foundations. One square mile is city, one square mile is orchards, one square mile is claypits, as well as the open ground of Ishtar's temple.Three square miles and the open ground comprise Uruk. Look for the copper tablet-box, Undo its bronze lock, Open the door to its secret, Lift out the lapis lazuli tablet and read."

Distinct characteristics of urban planning from remains of the cities of Harappa, Lothal, Dholavira, and Mohenjo-daro in the Indus Valley civilisation (in modern-day northwestern India and Pakistan) lead archeologists to interpret them as the earliest known examples of deliberately planned and managed cities. The streets of many of these early cities were paved and laid out at right angles in a grid pattern, with a hierarchy of streets from major boulevards to residential alleys. Archaeological evidence suggests that many Harrapan houses were laid out to protect from noise and to enhance residential privacy; many also had their own water wells, probably both for sanitary and for ritual purposes. These ancient cities were unique in that they often had drainage systems, seemingly tied to a well-developed ideal of urban sanitation. Cities laid out on the grid plan could have been an outgrowth of agriculture based on rectangular fields.

Most Mesoamerican cities in the late Postclassic period had highly organized central portions, typically consisting of one or more public plazas bordered by public buildings. In contrast, the surrounding residential areas typically showed little or no signs of planning.

== East Asia ==
China has a tradition of urban planning dating back thousands of years.

In Japan, some cities, such as Nara and Heian-kyo, followed classic Chinese planning principles; later, during the feudal period, a type of town called Jōkamachi emerged. Those were castle towns, planned for – and oriented around – defense. Roads were laid out to make the paths to castles longer; the castles and other buildings were often situated in order to hide the castles through densely packed surrounding buildings. Edo, later Tokyo, is one example of a castle town.

== Greco-Roman culture ==
Map of Pella, showing the grid plan of the city

Traditionally, the Greek philosopher Hippodamus (498–408 BC) is regarded as the first town planner and 'inventor' of the orthogonal urban layout. Aristotle called him "the father of city planning", and until well into the 20th century, he was indeed regarded as such. This is, however, only partly justified as Greek cities with orthogonal plans were built long before Hippodamus. The Hippodamian plan that was called after him is an orthogonal urban layout with more or less square street blocks. Archaeological finds from ancient Egypt—among others—demonstrate that Hippodamus cannot truly have been the inventor of this layout. Aristotle's critique and indeed ridicule of Hippodamus, which appears in Politics 2. 8, is perhaps the first known example of a criticism of urban planning.

From about the late 8th century on, Greek city-states started to found colonies along the coasts of the Mediterranean, which were centred on newly created towns and cities with more or less regular orthogonal plans. Gradually, the new layouts became more regular. After the city of Miletus was destroyed by the Persians in 494 BC, it was rebuilt in a regular form that, according to tradition, was determined by the ideas of Hippodamus of Miletus. Regular orthogonal plans particularly appear to have been laid out for new colonial cities and cities that were rebuilt in a short period of time after destruction.

Following in the tradition of Hippodamus about a century later, Alexander commissioned the architect Dinocrates to lay out his new city of Alexandria, the grandest example of idealised urban planning of the ancient Hellenistic world, where the city's regularity was facilitated by its level site near a mouth of the Nile.

The ancient Romans also employed regular orthogonal structures on which they molded their colonies. They probably were inspired by Greek and Hellenic examples, as well as by regularly planned cities that were built by the Etruscans in Italy. (See Marzabotto.) The Roman engineer Vitruvius established principles of good design whose influence is still felt today.

The Romans used a consolidated scheme for city planning, developed for civil convenience. The basic plan consisted of a central forum with city services, surrounded by a compact, rectilinear grid of streets. A river sometimes flowed near or through the city, providing water, transport, and sewage disposal. Hundreds of towns and cities were built by the Romans throughout their empire. Many European towns, such as Turin, preserve the remains of these schemes, which show the very logical way the Romans designed their cities. They would lay out the streets at right angles, in the form of a square grid. All roads were equal in width and length, except for two, which were slightly wider than the others. The decumanus, running east–west, and the cardo, running north–south, intersected in the middle to form the centre of the grid. All roads were made of carefully fitted flag stones and filled in with smaller, hard-packed rocks and pebbles. Bridges were constructed where needed. Each square marked by four roads was called an insula, the Roman equivalent of a modern city block. Each insula was about 80 yards (73 m) square. As the city developed, it could eventually be filled with buildings of various shapes and sizes and criss-crossed with back roads and alleys.

The city may have been surrounded by a wall to protect it from invaders and to mark the city limits. Areas outside city limits were left open as farmland. At the end of each main road was a large gateway with watchtowers. A portcullis covered the opening when the city was under siege, and additional watchtowers were constructed along the city walls. An aqueduct was built outside the city walls.

The development of Greek and Roman urbanisation is relatively well-known, as there are relatively many written sources, and there has been much attention to the subject since the Romans and Greeks are generally regarded as the main ancestors of modern Western culture. It should not be forgotten, though, that there were also other cultures with more or less urban settlements in Europe, primarily of Celtic origin. Among these, there are also cases that appear to have been newly planned, such as the Lusatian town of Biskupin in Poland.

== Medieval Europe (500–1400) ==
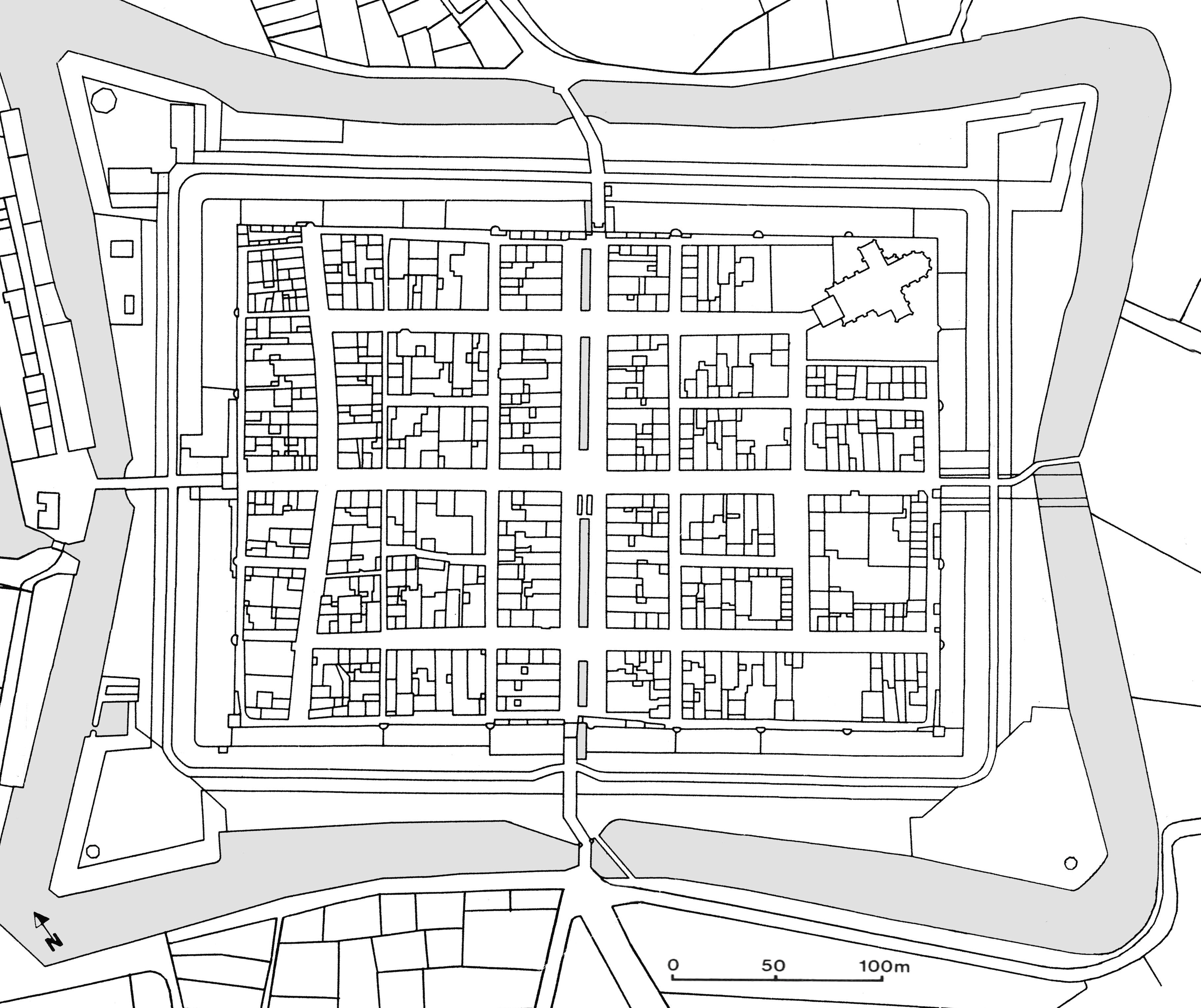
Plan of Elburg in The Netherlands, based on the cadastral plan of 1830. Elburg was founded in 1392 by Arent toe Boecop, steward of the duke of Gelre. Arent seems to have acted as a private entrepreneur. He had bought a piece of land next to the existing town, and he obtained permission from his lord to extend and rebuild the town, and to resettle the population of the surrounding area, selling the house lots to the settlers. The highly symmetrical layout is centred on a canalised river and an intersecting street. The symmetry is disturbed, however, by the church in the eastern corner and by the pre-existing street (the only curved one in the whole town) on the northwest side. The corner bastions and the wide outer ditch were added in the late 16th century.

After the gradual disintegration and fall of the West-Roman empire in the 5th century and the devastation by the invasions of Huns, Germanic peoples, Byzantines, Moors, Magyars, and Normans in the next five centuries, little remained of urban culture in western and central Europe. In the 10th and 11th centuries, though, there appears to have been a general improvement in the political stability and economy. This made it possible for trade and craft to grow and for the monetary economy and urban culture to revive. Initially, urban culture recovered particularly in existing settlements, often in remnants of Roman towns and cities, but later on, ever more towns were created anew. Meanwhile, the population of western Europe increased rapidly and the utilised agricultural area grew with it. The agricultural areas of existing villages were extended and new villages and towns were created in uncultivated areas as cores for new reclamations.

Urban development in the early Middle Ages, characteristically focused on a fortress, a fortified abbey, or a (sometimes abandoned) Roman nucleus, occurred "like the annular rings of a tree", whether in an extended village or the centre of a larger city. Since the new centre was often on high, defensible ground, the city plan took on an organic character, following the irregularities of elevation contours like the shapes that result from agricultural terracing.

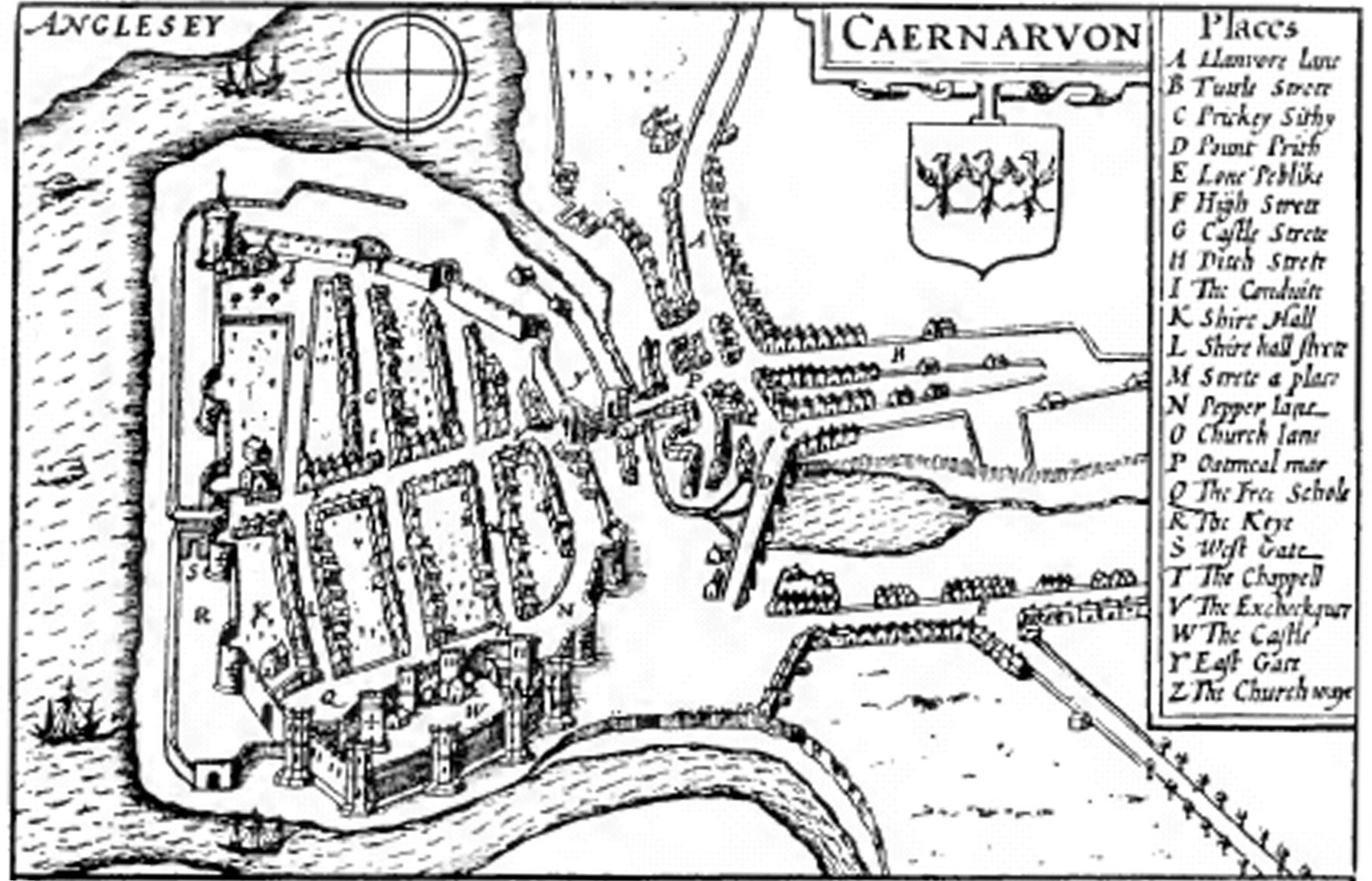
Caernarvon (Wales). Plan by John Speed, 1611. Caernarfon castle and town were re-founded by King Edward I of England in July 1283, during his second Welsh campaign to end the Second War of Independence.

In the 9th to 14th centuries, many hundreds of new towns were built in Europe, and many others were enlarged with newly planned extensions. These new towns and town extensions have played a very important role in the shaping of Europe's geographical structures as they in modern times. New towns were founded in different parts of Europe from about the 9th century on, but most of them were realised from the 12th to 14th centuries, with a peak-period at the end of the 13th. All kinds of landlords, from the highest to the lowest rank, tried to found new towns on their estates, in order to gain economical, political or military power. The settlers of the new towns generally were attracted by fiscal, economic, and juridical advantages granted by the founding lord, or were forced to move from elsewhere from his estates. Most of the new towns were to remain rather small (as for instance the bastides of southwestern France), but some of them became important cities, such as Cardiff, Leeds, 's-Hertogenbosch, Montauban, Bilbao, Malmö, Lübeck, Munich, Berlin, Bern, Klagenfurt, Alessandria, Warsaw and Sarajevo.

From the evidence of the preserved towns, it appears that the formal structure of many of these towns was willfully planned. The newly founded towns often show a marked regularity in their plan form, in the sense that the streets are often straight and laid out at right angles to one another, and that the house lots are rectangular, and originally largely of the same size. One very clear and relatively extreme example is Elburg in the Netherlands, dating from the end of the 14th century. (see illustration) Looking at town plans such as the one of Elburg, it clearly appears that it is impossible to maintain that the straight street and the symmetrical, orthogonal town plan were new inventions from 'the Renaissance,' and, therefore, typical of 'modern times.'

The deep depression around the middle of the 14th century marked the end of the period of great urban expansion. Only in the parts of Europe where the process of urbanisation had started relatively late, as in eastern Europe, was it still to go on for one or two more centuries. It would not be until the Industrial Revolution that the same level of expansion of urban population would be reached again, although the number of newly created settlements would remain much lower than in the 12th and 13th centuries.

== Renaissance and Baroque Europe (1400–1750) ==
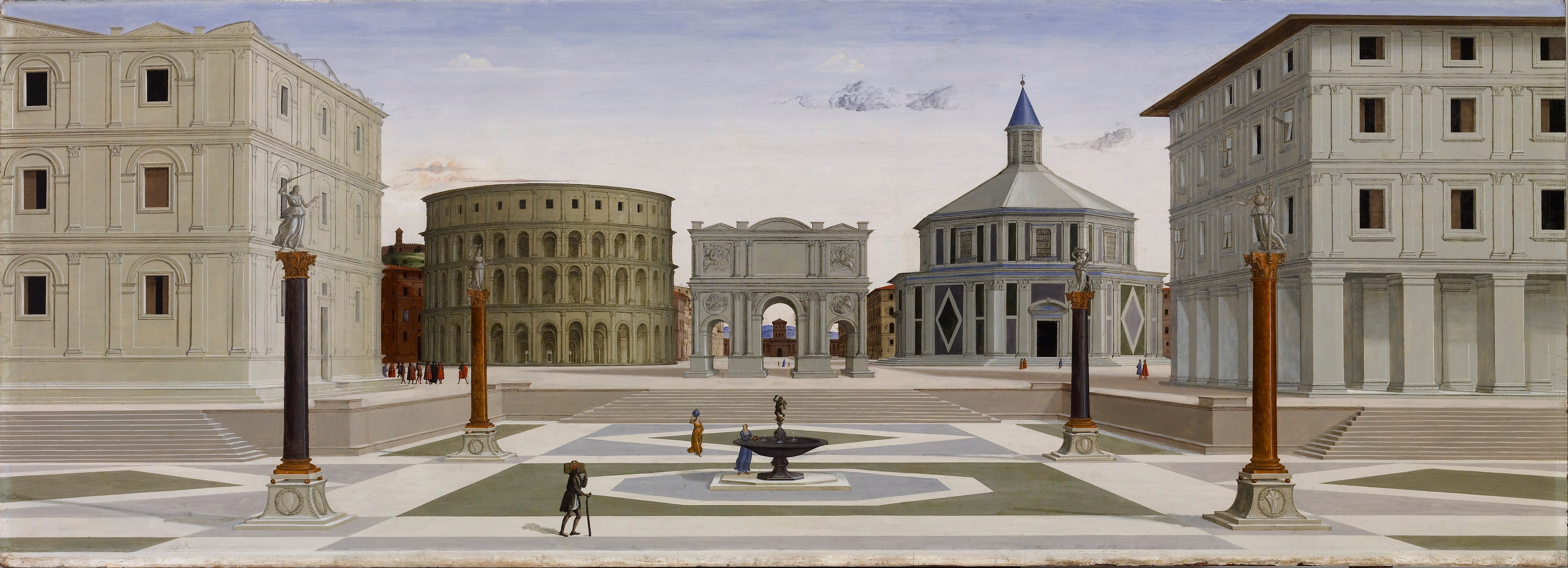
The Ideal City (probably by Fra Carnevale, c. 1480–1484) exemplifies Renaissance ideals of urban planning. The Roman archway and colosseum suggest the value of military victory and mass entertainment.

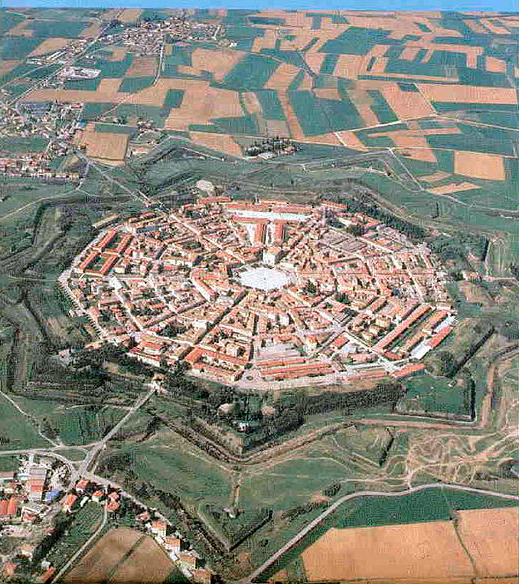
Palmanova, a foritifed town Northeast Italy, built by the Venetian Republic from 1593, that is an example of a star fort of the late Renaissance,

Florence was an early model of the new urban planning, which took on a star-shaped layout adapted from the new star fort, designed to resist cannon fire. This model was widely imitated, reflecting the enormous cultural power of Florence in this age; "[t]he Renaissance was hypnotised by one city type which for a century and a half – from Filarete to Scamozzi – was impressed upon utopian schemes: this is the star-shaped city". Radial streets extend outward from a defined centre of military, communal or spiritual power.

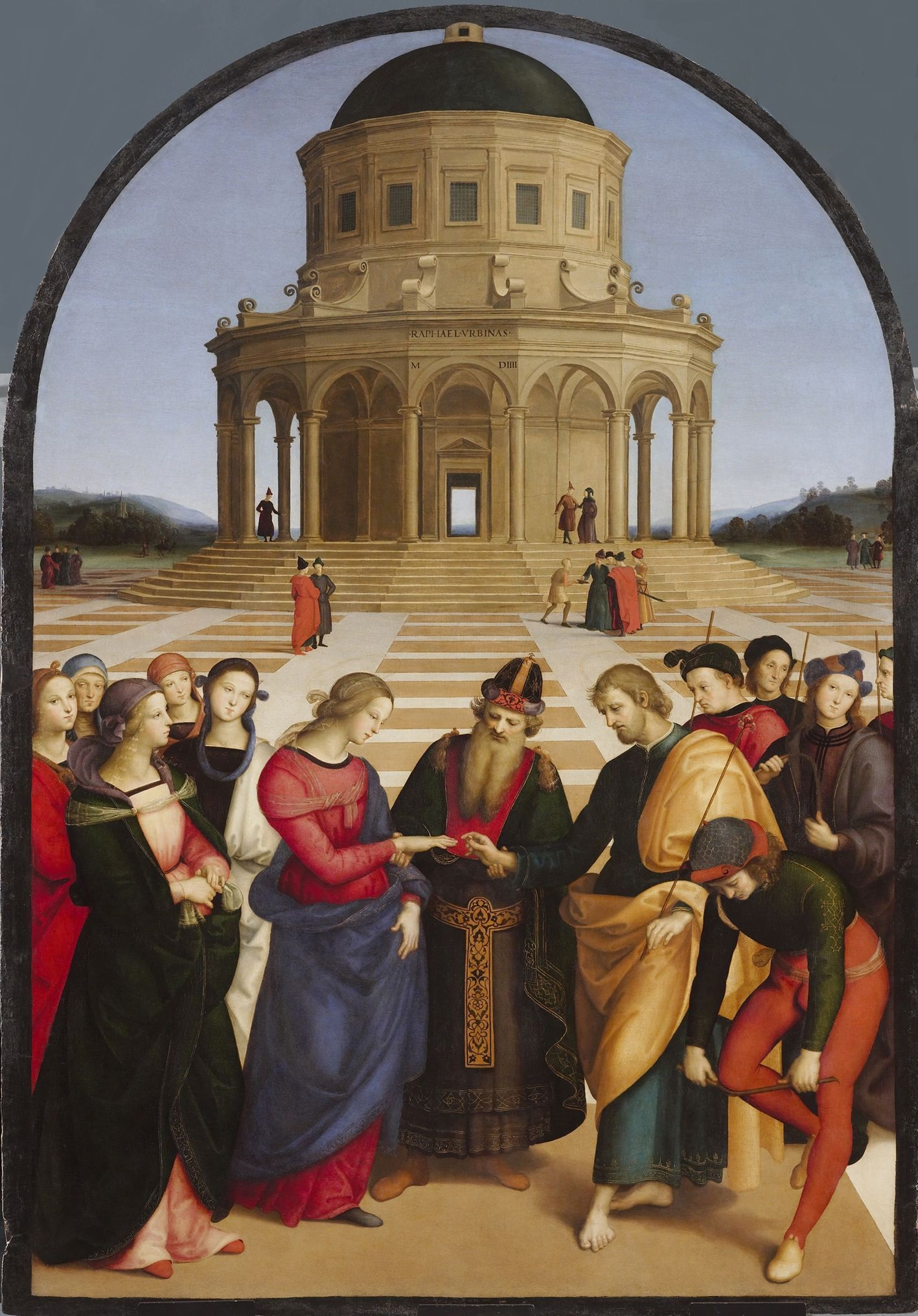
The ideal centrally planned urban space: Sposalizio by Raphael Sanzio, 1504

Only in ideal cities did a centrally planned structure stand at the heart, as in Raphael's Sposalizio (Illustration) of 1504. As built, the unique example of a rationally planned quattrocento new city centre, that of Vigevano (1493–95), resembles a closed space instead, surrounded by arcading.

Filarete's ideal city, building on Leon Battista Alberti's De re aedificatoria, was named "Sforzinda" in compliment to his patron; its twelve-pointed shape, circumscribable by a "perfect" Pythagorean figure, the circle, took no heed of its undulating terrain in Filarete's manuscript. This process occurred in cities, but ordinarily not in the industrial suburbs characteristic of this era (see Braudel, The Structures of Everyday Life), which remained disorderly and characterised by crowding and organic growth.

One of the most significant programmes of urban planning in the Baroque Period was Rome. Inspired by the ideal of the Renaissance city, Pope Sixtus V's ambitious urban reform programme transformed the old environment to emulate the "long straight streets, wide regular spaces, uniformity and repetitiveness of structures, lavish use of commemorative and ornamental elements, and maximum visibility from both linear and circular perspective." The Pope set no limit to his plans, and achieved much in his short pontificate, always carried through at top speed: the completion of the dome of St. Peter's; the loggia of Sixtus in the Basilica di San Giovanni in Laterano; the chapel of the Praesepe in Santa Maria Maggiore; additions or repairs to the Quirinal, Lateran and Vatican palaces; the erection of four obelisks, including that in Saint Peter's Square; the opening of six streets; the restoration of the aqueduct of Septimius Severus ("Acqua Felice"); the integration of the Leonine City in Rome as XIV Rione (Borgo).

During this period, rulers often embarked on ambitious attempts at redesigning their capital cities as a showpiece for the grandeur of the nation. Disasters were often a major catalyst for planned reconstruction. An exception to this was in London after the Great Fire of 1666 when, despite many radical rebuilding schemes from architects such as John Evelyn and Christopher Wren, no large-scale redesigning was achieved due to the complexities of rival ownership claims. However, improvements were made in hygiene and fire safety with wider streets, stone construction and access to the river. The Great Fire did, however, stimulate thinking about urban design that influenced city planning in North America. The Grand Model for the Province of Carolina, developed in the aftermath of the Great Fire, established a template for colonial planning. The famous Oglethorpe Plan for Savannah (1733) was in part influenced by the Grand Model.

Following the 1695 bombardment of Brussels by the French troops of King Louis XIV, in which a large part of the city centre was destroyed, Governor Max Emanuel proposed using the reconstruction to completely change the layout and architectural style of the city. His plan was to transform the medieval city into a city of the new Baroque style, modelled on Turin, which from 1600 was transformed by Charles Emmanuel I, Duke of Savoy into one of the earliest Baroque cities. With a logical street layout, straight avenues offered long, uninterrupted views flanked by buildings of a uniform size. This plan was opposed by residents and municipal authorities, who wanted a rapid reconstruction, did not have the resources for grandiose proposals, and resented what they considered the imposition of a new, foreign, architectural style. In the actual reconstruction, the general layout of the city was conserved, but it was not identical to that before the cataclysm. Despite the necessity of rapid reconstruction and the lack of financial means, authorities did take several measures to improve traffic flow, sanitation, and the aesthetics of the city. Many streets were made as wide as possible to improve traffic flow.

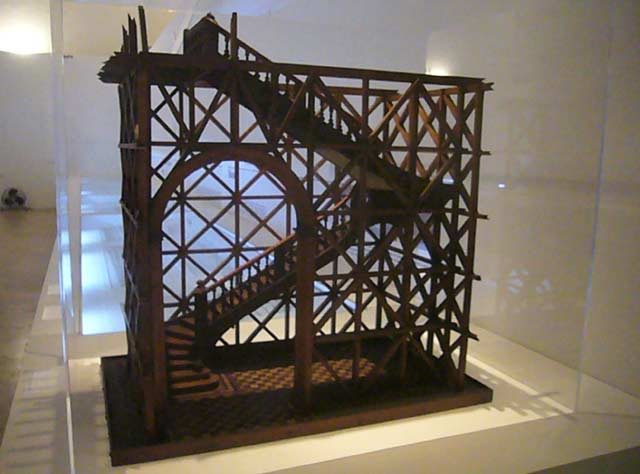
Model of the seismically protective wooden structure, the "gaiola pombalina" (pombaline cage), developed for the reconstruction of Pombaline Lower Town

== Enlightenment, Europe and America (1700–1800) ==
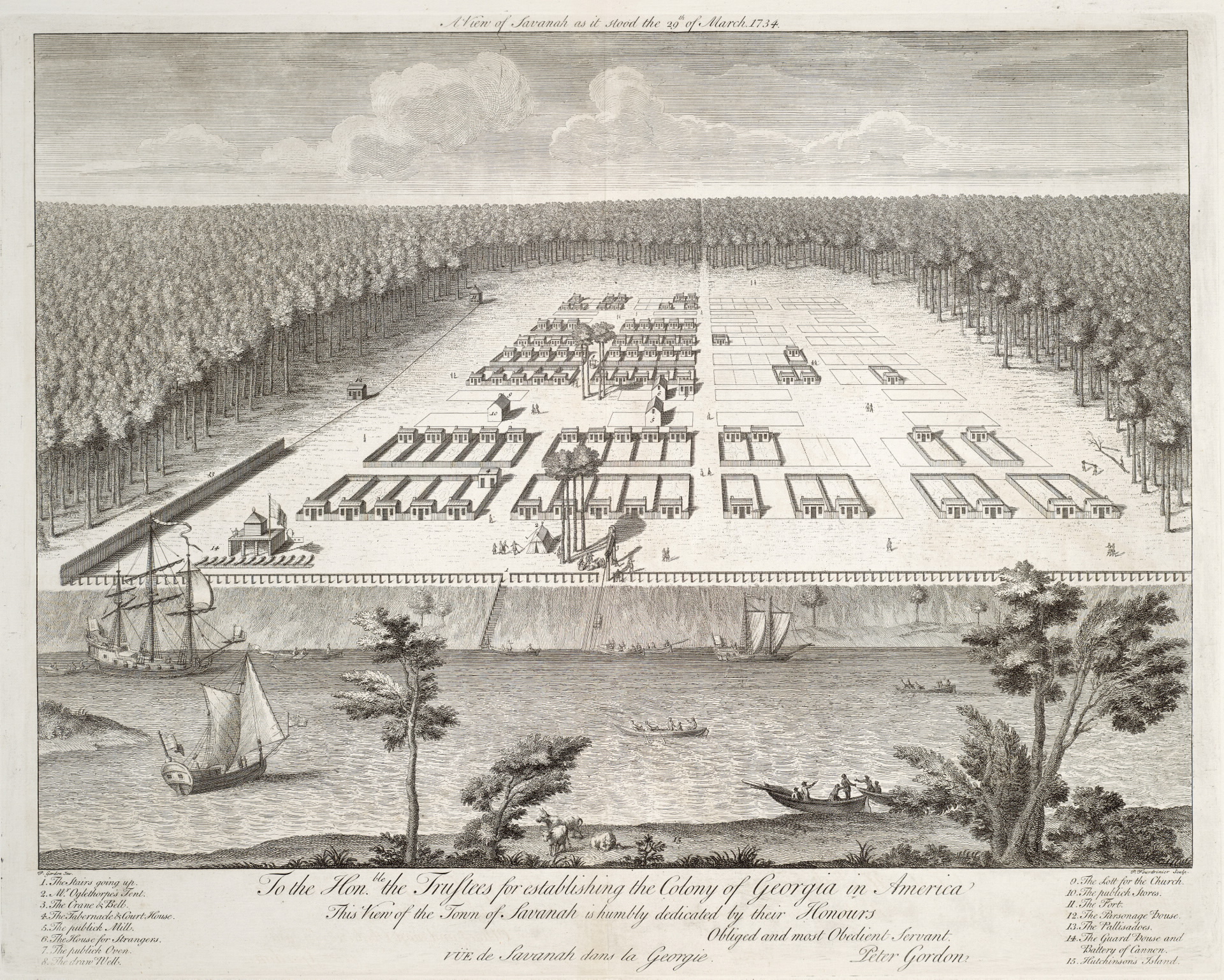
Illustration of Savannah, Georgia on the Oglethorpe Plan in 1734.

The L'Enfant Plan for Washington, D.C., as revised by Andrew Ellicott in 1792

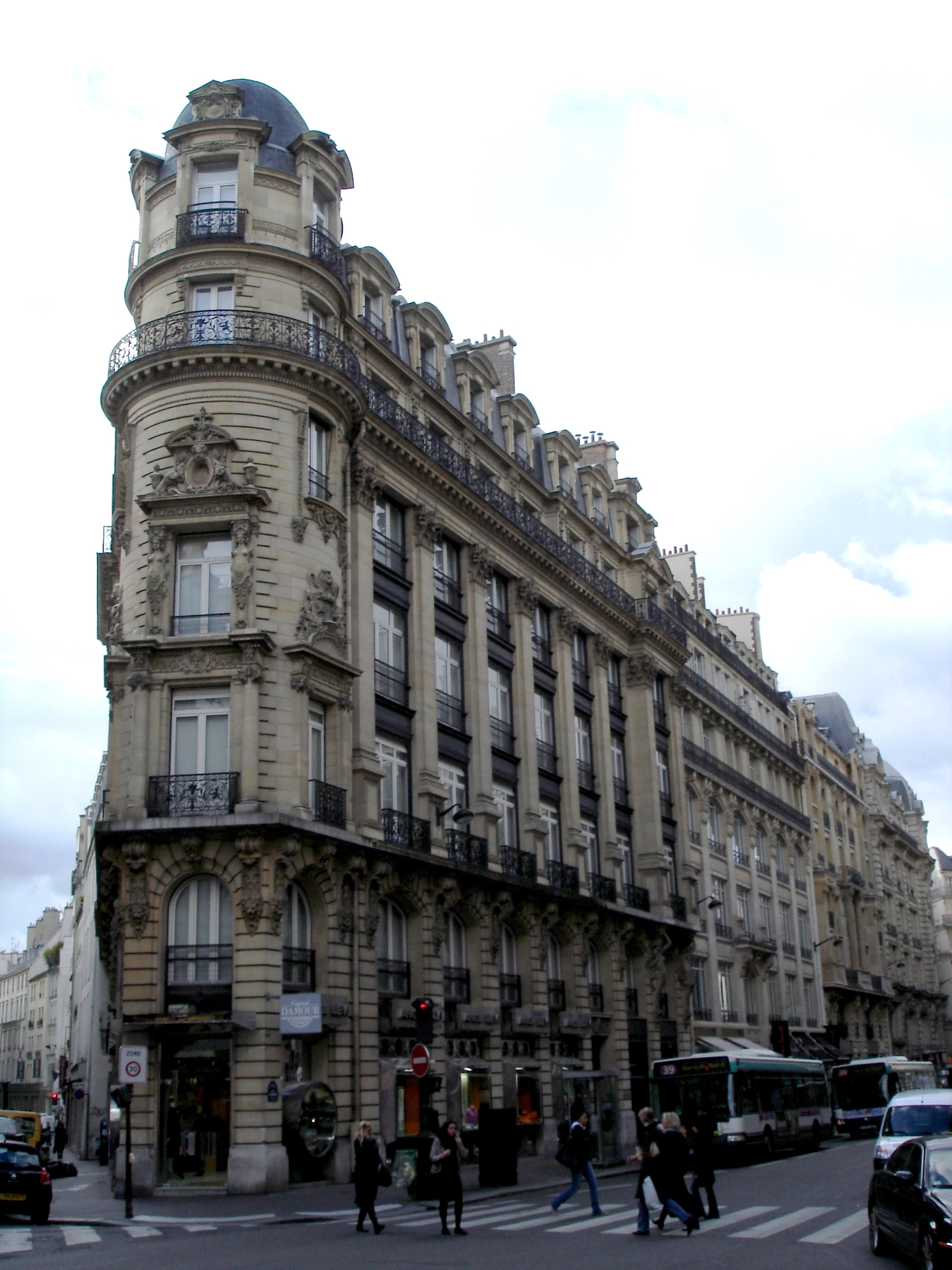
During the Second French Empire, Haussmann transformed the medieval city of Paris into a modern capital, with long, straight, wide boulevards. The planning was influenced by many factors, not the least of which was the city's history of street revolutions.

In contrast to the Great Fire of London, after the 1755 Lisbon earthquake, King Joseph I of Portugal and his ministers immediately launched efforts to rebuild the city. The architect Manuel da Maia boldly proposed razing entire sections of the city and "laying out new streets without restraint". This last option was chosen by the king and his minister in spite of its emphasis on commerce and industry as opposed to religious and royal structures. Keen to have a new and perfectly ordered city, the king commissioned the construction of big squares, rectilinear, large avenues and widened streets – the new mottos of Lisbon. The Pombaline buildings were among the earliest seismically protected constructions in Europe.

Another significant urban plan from the Enlightenment period was that of Edinburgh's New Town, built in stages between 1767 and 1850. The Age of Enlightenment had arrived in Edinburgh, and the outdated city fabric did not suit the professional and merchant classes who lived there. A design competition was held in January 1766 to find a suitably modern layout for the new suburb. It was won by 26-year-old James Craig, who proposed a simple axial grid, with a principal thoroughfare along the ridge linking two garden squares. The New Town was envisaged as a mainly residential suburb with a number of professional offices of domestic layout. It had few planned retail ground floors, however it did not take long for the commercial potential of the site to be realised.

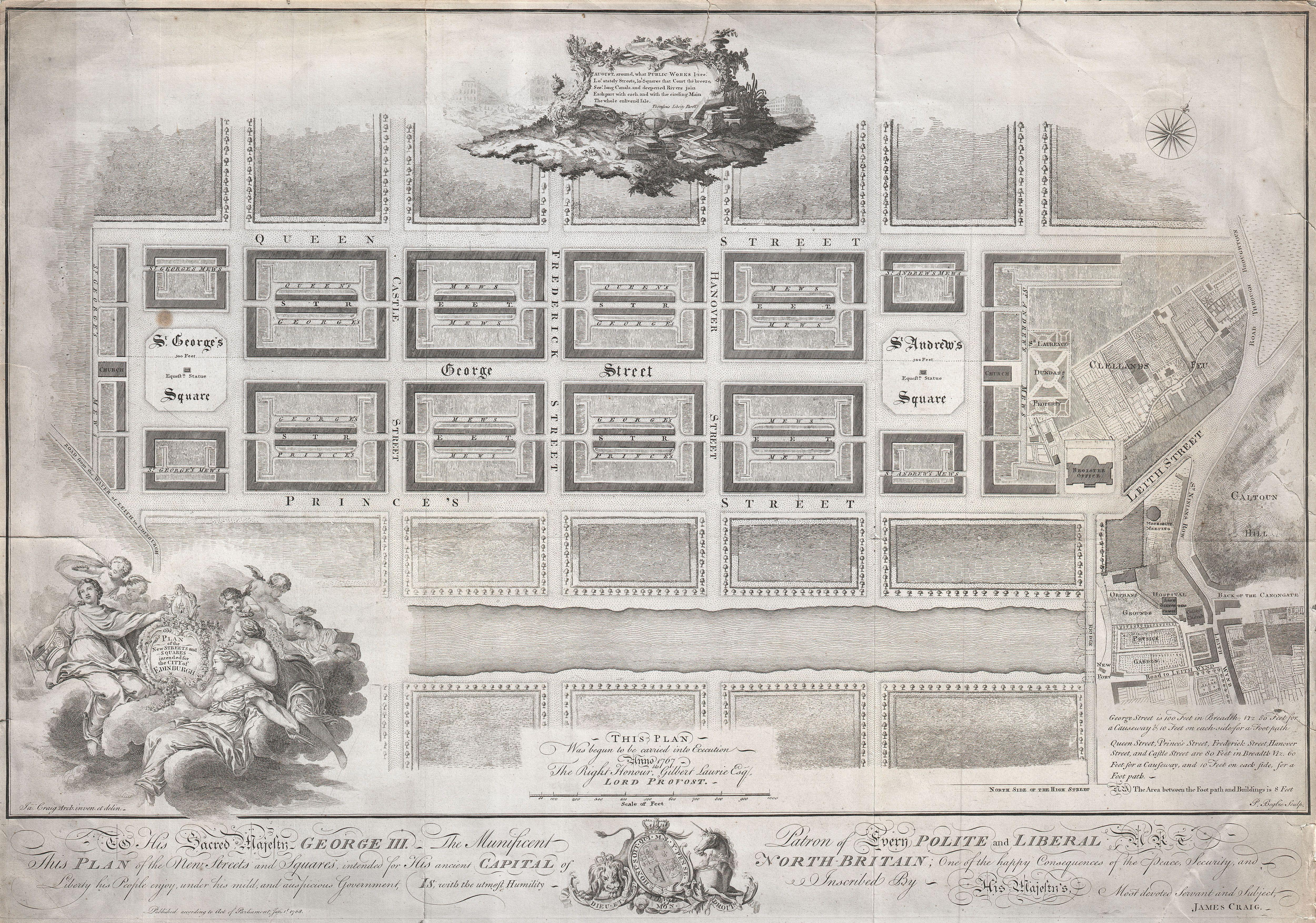
Craig's 1768 Plan for Edinburgh's New Town

== Modern urban planning (1800–onwards) ==
From 1800 onwards, urban planning developed as a technical and legal occupation and in its complexity. Regent Street was one of the first planned developments of London. An ordered structure of London streets, replacing the mediaeval layout, had been planned since just after the Great Fire of London (1666) when Sir Christopher Wren and John Evelyn drew plans for rebuilding the city on the classical formal model. The street was designed by John Nash (who had been appointed to the Office of Woods and Forests in 1806 and previously served as an adviser to the Prince Regent) and by developer James Burton. The design was adopted by an act of Parliament, the New Street Act 1813 (53 Geo. 3. c. 121), which permitted the commissioners to borrow £600,000 for building and construction. The street was intended for commercial purposes and it was expected that most of the income would come from private capital. Nash took responsibility for design and valuation of all properties Construction of the road required demolishing numerous properties, disrupting trade and polluting the air with dust. Existing tenants had first offer to purchase leases on the new properties.

An even more ambitious reconstruction was carried out in Paris. In 1852, Georges-Eugène Haussmann was commissioned to remodel the Medieval street plan of the city by demolishing swathes of the old quarters and laying out wide boulevards, extending outwards beyond the old city limits. Haussmann's project encompassed all aspects of urban planning, both in the centre of Paris and in the surrounding districts, with regulations imposed on building façades, public parks, sewers and water works, city facilities, and public monuments. Beyond aesthetic and sanitary considerations, the wide thoroughfares facilitated troop movement and policing.

A concurrent plan to extend Barcelona was based on a scientific analysis of the city and its modern requirements. It was drawn up by the Catalan engineer Ildefons Cerdà to fill the space beyond the city walls after they were demolished from 1854. He is credited with inventing the term 'urbanisation' and his approach was codified in his Teoría General de la Urbanización (General Theory of Urbanisation, 1867). Cerdà's Eixample (Catalan for 'extension') consisted of 550 regular blocks with chamfered corners to facilitate the movement of trams, crossed by three wider avenues. His objectives were to improve the health of the inhabitants, towards which the blocks were built around central gardens and orientated NW-SE to maximise the sunlight they received, and assist social integration.

Proposals were also developed at the same time from 1857 for Vienna's Ringstrasse. This grand boulevard was built to replace the city walls. In 1857, Emperor Franz Joseph I of Austria issued the decree ordering the demolition of the city walls and moats. During the following years, a large number of opulent public and private buildings were erected. Similarly, Berlin finalized its "Bebauungsplan der Umgebungen Berlins" (Binding Land-Use Plan for the Environs of Berlin) in 1862, intended for a time frame of about 50 years. The plan not only covered the area around the cities of Berlin and Charlottenburg but also described the spatial regional planning of a large perimeter. The plan resulted in large areas of dense urban city blocks known as 'blockrand structures', with mixed-use buildings reaching to the street and offering a common-used courtyard, later often overbuilt with additional court structures to house more people.

Planning and architecture continued its paradigm shift at the turn of the 20th century. The industrialised cities of the 19th century had grown at a tremendous rate, with the pace and style of building often dictated by private business concerns. The evils of urban life for the working poor were becoming increasingly evident as a matter for public concern. The laissez-faire style of government management of the economy, in fashion for most of the Victorian era, was starting to give way to a New Liberalism that championed intervention on the part of the poor and disadvantaged beyond urban planning as a primarily aesthetic and technical concern as in the major urban planning programmes in European cities. Around 1900, theorists began developing urban planning models to mitigate the consequences of the industrial age, by providing citizens, especially factory workers, with healthier environments.

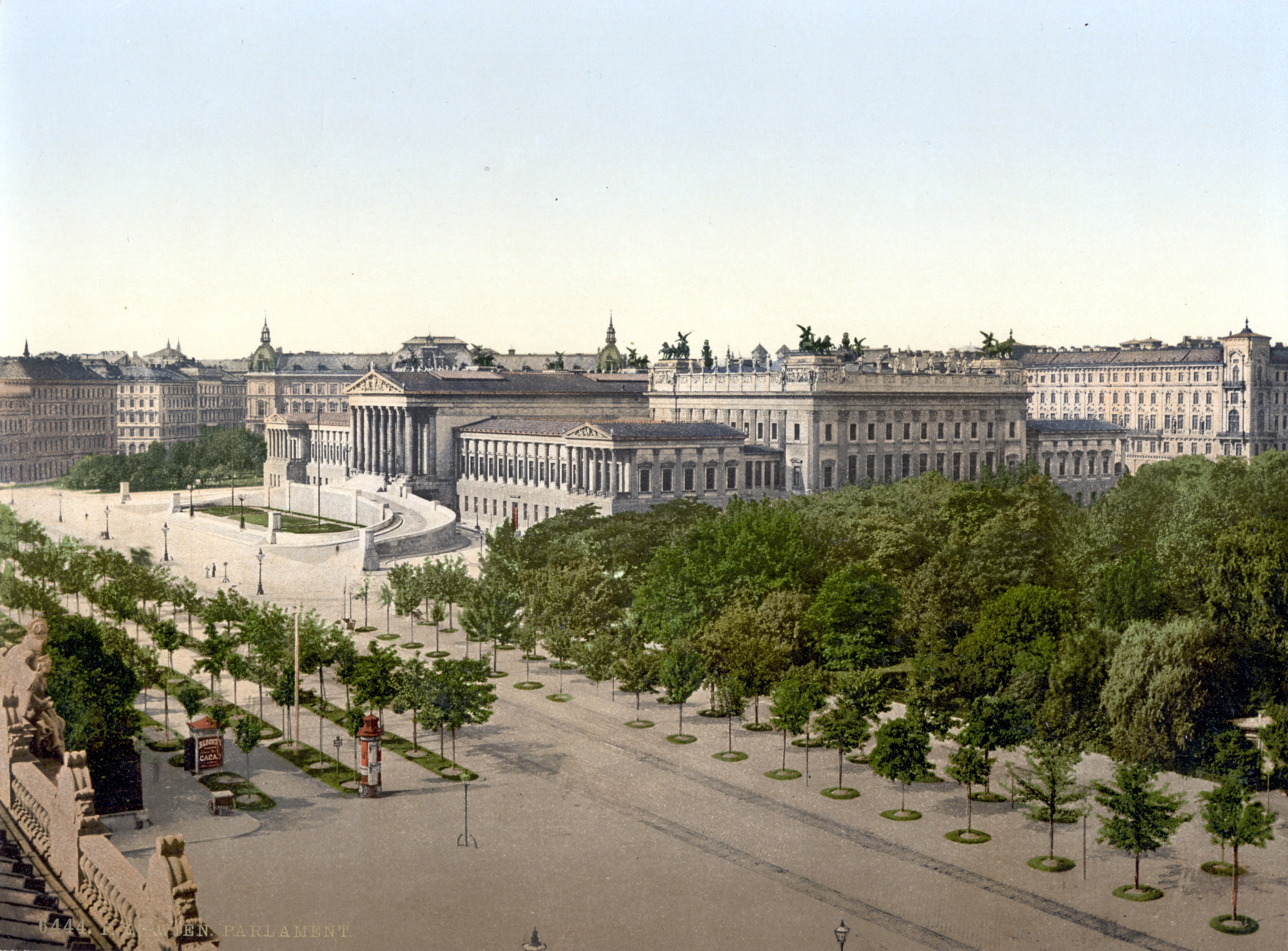
The Vienna Ring Road (German: Ringstraße, lit. ring road) is a circular grand boulevard that serves as a ring road around the historic Innere Stadt (Inner Town) district of Vienna, Austria. The road is located on sites where medieval city fortifications once stood, including high walls and the broad open field ramparts (glacis), criss-crossed by paths that lay before them.

Modern zoning legislation and other tools such as compulsory purchase and land readjustment, which enabled planners to legally demarcate sections of cities for different functions or determine the shape and depth of urban blocks, originated in Prussia, and spread to Britain, the US, and Scandinavia. Public health was cited as a rationale for keeping cities organized.

=== Urban planning profession and legislation ===
Urban planning became professionalised at this period, with input from utopian visionaries as well as from the practical minded infrastructure engineers and local councillors combining to produce new design templates for political consideration. Reinhard Baumeister was a German engineer and urban planner, the author of one of the earliest texts on urban planning Stadterweiterungen in technischer, baupolizeilicher und Wirtschaftlicher Beziehung (Town extensions: their links with technical and economic concerns and with building regulations) published in 1876. It was used as a textbook at the first urban planning course in Germany, at the college of technology in Aachen in 1880.

Similarly influential was Josef Stübben's 1890 publication Der Stadtebau, published in 1890 and again in 1907 and 1924. Stübben served as the chief city planner of Cologne between 1881 and 1898 and was influential in his advocacy for the social objectives of city planning particularly for the urban poor.

The publication was never translated into English, but Stübben presented papers at numerous city planning conferences, including at the 1910 conference on city planning sponsored by the Royal Institute of British Architects, alongside Daniel Burnham, Ebenezer Howard, Patrick Geddes and Raymond Unwin. That same year the U.S. Senate published guidance on city planning that contained examples of German planning legislation directly influenced by Stübben. Whilst some theorists have recognised that American planning was primarily influenced by German and British practices, the German influence has not been as widely studied as a result of geopolitical tensions in and around the World Wars.

Legislation enabling the laying out of urban plans by municipalities and compulsory purchase powers were set out in the German Federal Building Line Act of 1875, but the 1794 Allgemeines Landrecht already gave the local state authority, namely the police, the right to indicate Fluchtlinien, i.e. the boundaries of areas which were to be reserved for streets. After the Prussian municipal reform of 1808 the Baupolizei became accountable to the municipal administration (with the important exception of Berlin), which thus also became responsible for the planning function.

Such tools were already widely used in France which from 1807 required settlements of over 2,000 inhabitants to prepare a compulsory easement plan setting out building lines and the width of the streets between them. In 1889, the architect and urban theorist Camillo Sitte published City Planning According to Artistic Principles, in which he examined and documented the traditional, incremental approach to urbanism in Europe, with a close focus on public spaces in Italy and the Germanic countries. Sitte's work was hugely influential on European urbanism, and with five editions published between 1889 and 1922 was cited by planners from Raymond Unwin to Berlage.

In Britain, the Town and Country Planning Association was founded in 1899 and the first academic course on urban planning in Britain was offered by the University of Liverpool in 1909. The first official consideration of these new trends in Britain was embodied in the Housing, Town Planning, &c. Act 1909 that compelled local authorities to introduce coherent systems of town planning across the country using the new principles of the 'garden city', and to ensure that all housing construction conformed to specific building standards, while similar yet more comprehensive legislation was enacted in the Netherlands under the Housing Act 1901, known as the Woningwet. Following Britain's 1909 Act, surveyors, civil engineers, architects, lawyers and others began working together within local government in the UK to draw up schemes for the development of land and the idea of town planning as a new and distinctive area of expertise began to be formed. In 1910, Thomas Adams was appointed as the first Town Planning Inspector at the Local Government Board, and began meeting with practitioners. The Town Planning Institute was established in 1914 with a mandate to advance the study of town-planning and civic design. The first university course in America was established at Harvard University in 1924.

=== Garden city movement ===
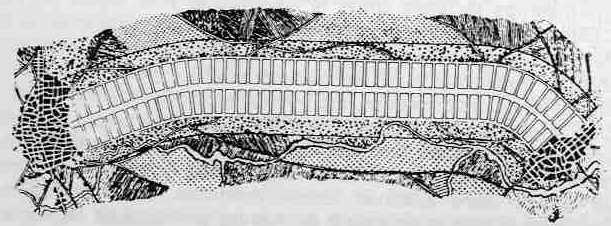
The concept of Arturo Soria's of the linear city model and the "linear city movement"

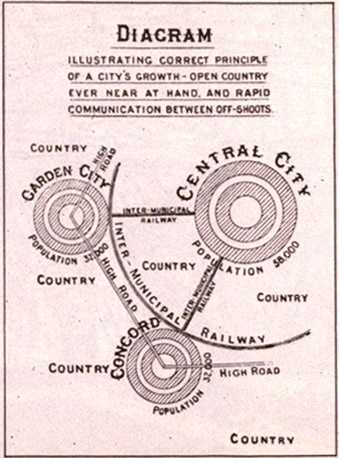
Ebenezer Howard's influential 1902 diagram, illustrating urban growth through garden city "off-shoots"

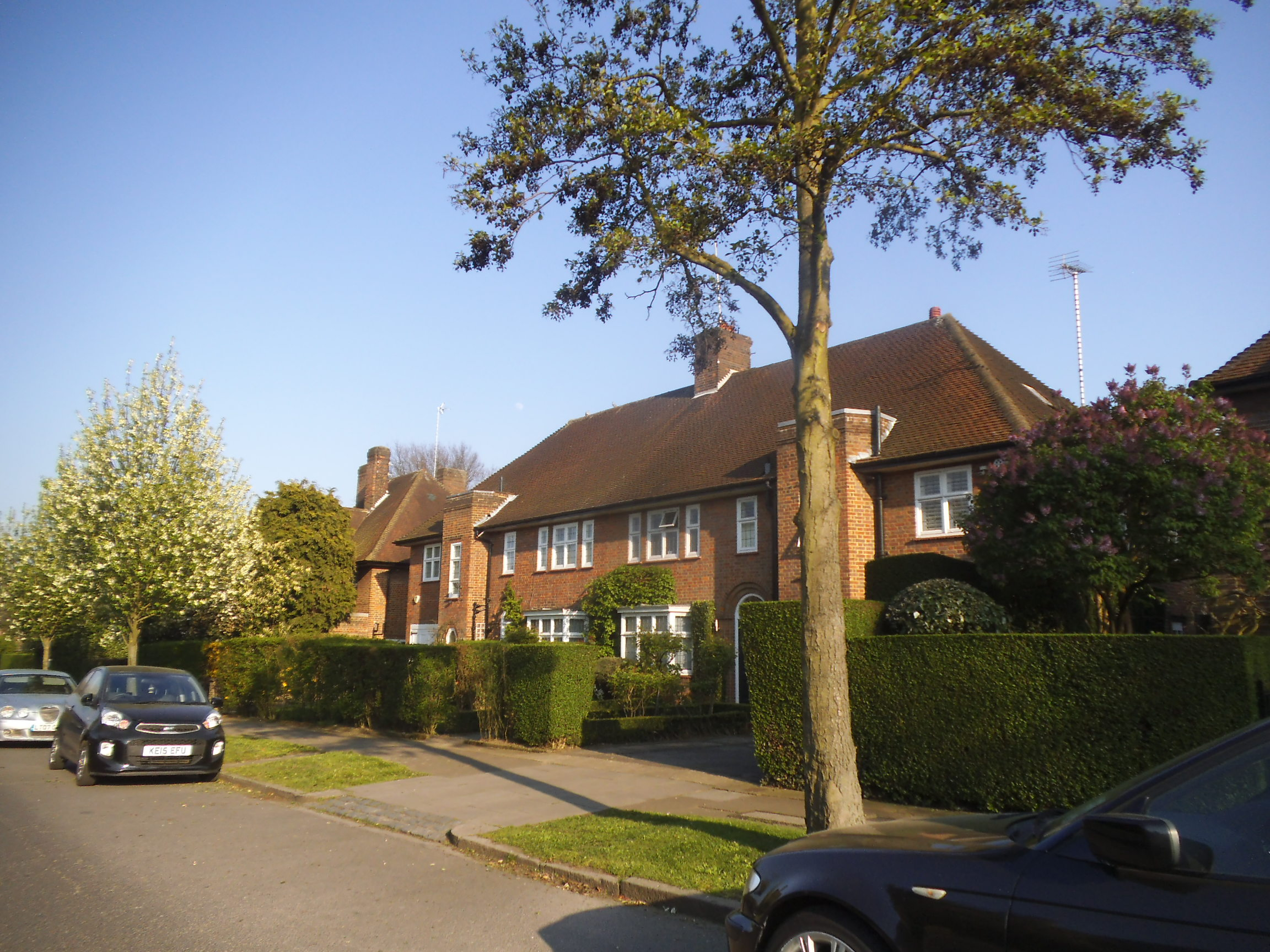
Hampstead Garden Suburb

The first major urban planning theorist in Britain was Sir Ebenezer Howard, who initiated the garden city movement in 1898. This was inspired by earlier planned communities built by industrial philanthropists in the countryside, such as Cadburys' Bournville, Lever's Port Sunlight and George Pullman's eponymous Pullman in Chicago. All these settlements decentralised the working environment from the centre of the cities, and provided a healthy living space for the factory workers. Howard generalised this achievement into a planned movement for the country as a whole. He was also influenced by the work of economist Alfred Marshall who argued in 1884 that industry needed a supply of labour that could in theory be supplied anywhere, and that companies have an incentive to improve workers living standards as the company bears much of the cost inflicted by the unhealthy urban conditions in the big cities.

Howard's ideas, although utopian, were also highly practical and were adopted around the world in the ensuing decades. His garden cities were intended to be planned, self-contained communities surrounded by parks, containing proportionate and separate areas of residences, industry, and agriculture. Inspired by the Utopian novel Looking Backward and Henry George's work Progress and Poverty, Howard published his book Garden Cities of To-morrow in 1898, commonly regarded as the most important book in the history of urban planning. His idealised garden city would house 32,000 people on a site of 6,000 acres (2,428 ha), planned on a concentric pattern with open spaces, public parks and six radial boulevards, 120 ft (37 m) wide, extending from the centre. The garden city would be self-sufficient and when it reached full population, another garden city would be developed nearby. Howard envisaged a cluster of several garden cities as satellites of a central city of 50,000 people, linked by road and rail.

He founded First Garden City, Ltd. in 1899 to create the first garden city at Letchworth, Hertfordshire. Donors to the project collected interest on their investment if the garden city generated profits through rents or, as Fishman calls the process, 'philanthropic land speculation'. Howard tried to include working class cooperative organisations, which included over two million members, but could not win their financial support. In 1904, Raymond Unwin, a noted architect and town planner, along with his partner Richard Barry Parker, won the competition run by the First Garden City, Limited to plan Letchworth, an area 34 miles outside London. Unwin and Parker planned the town in the centre of the Letchworth estate with Howard's large agricultural greenbelt surrounding the town, and they shared Howard's notion that the working class deserved better and more affordable housing. However, the architects ignored Howard's symmetric design, instead replacing it with a more 'organic' design.

Welwyn Garden City, also in Hertfordshire was also built on Howard's principles. His successor as chairman of the Garden City Association was Sir Frederic Osborn, who extended the movement to regional planning. The principles of the garden city were soon applied to the planning of city suburbs. The first such project was the Hampstead Garden Suburb founded by Henrietta Barnett and planned by Parker and Unwin. The scheme's utopian ideals were that it should be open to all classes of people with free access to woods and gardens and that the housing should be of low density with wide, tree-lined roads. The Tudor Walters Committee that recommended the building of housing estates after World War I incorporated the ideas of Howard's disciple Raymond Unwin, who demonstrated that homes could be built rapidly and economically whilst maintaining satisfactory standards for gardens, family privacy and internal spaces. Unwin diverged from Howard by proposing that the new developments should be peripheral 'satellites' rather than fully-fledged garden cities.

In North America, the Garden City movement was also popular, and evolved into the "Neighbourhood Unit" form of development. In the early 1900s, as cars were introduced to city streets for the first time, residents became increasingly concerned with the number of pedestrians being injured by car traffic. The response, seen first in Radburn, New Jersey, was the Neighbourhood Unit-style development, which oriented houses toward a common public path instead of the street. The neighbourhood is distinctively organised around a school, with the intention of providing children a safe way to walk to school.

In Europe, Garden Cities were also promoted by a range of organisations including the International Garden Cities and Town Planning Association, the international branch of the British Garden Cities and Town Planning Association. The International Association held a series of conferences across Europe including in Brussels in 1919, Paris in 1922; Gothenburg in 1923; Amsterdam in 1924; New York in 1925, and finally Vienna in 1926. These congresses must have had a strong appeal to housing reformers and town planners with more than more than 300 for Gothenburg 1923; more than 500 for Amsterdam 1924; over 1,000 for Vienna 1926. Belgium, France, Sweden, The Netherlands and Austria all experienced the influence of the garden city movement during this period.

=== Modernism ===
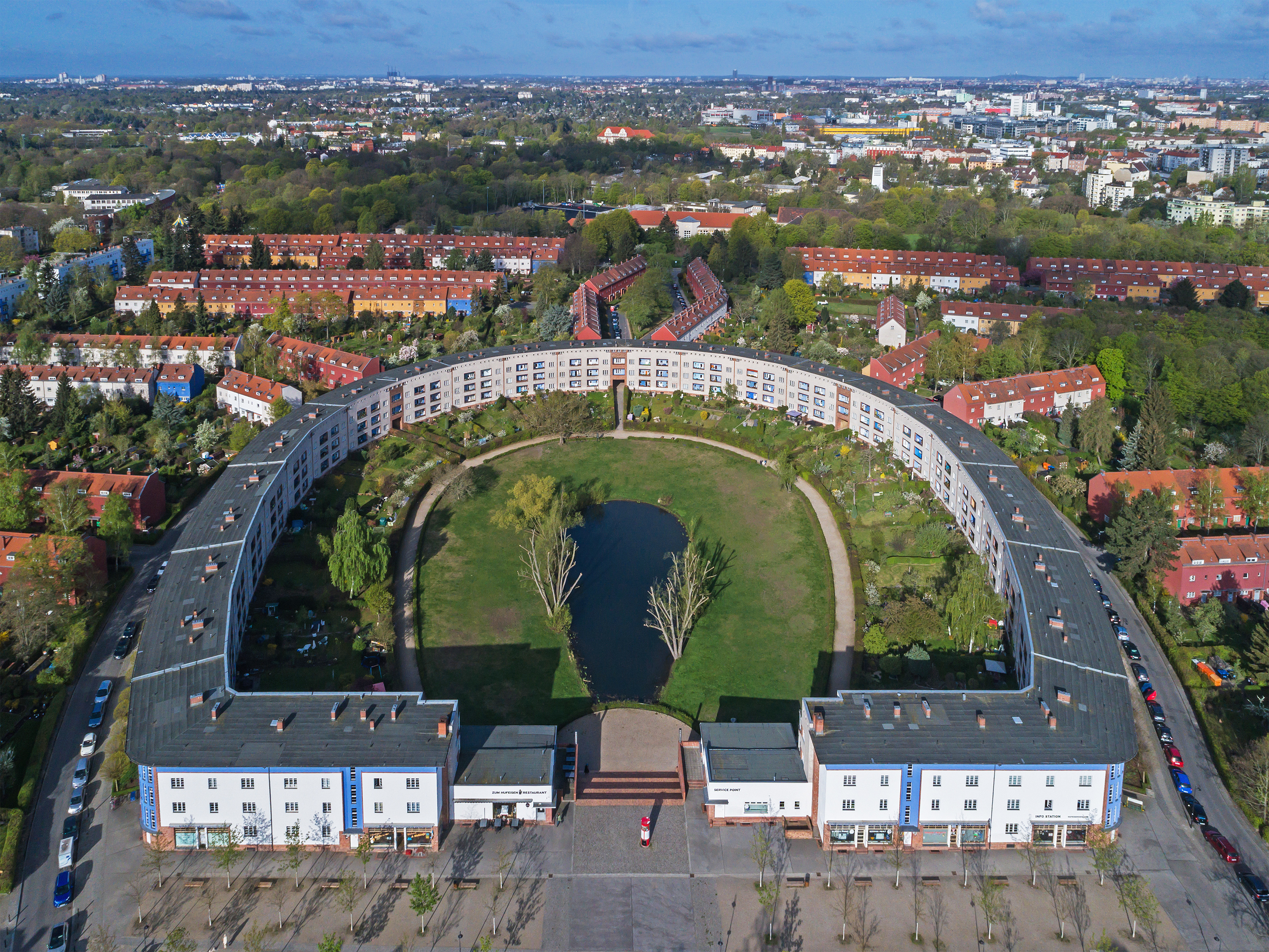
The Hufeisensiedlung ("Horseshoe Estate") is a housing estate in Berlin, built in 1925–33 designed by architect Bruno Taut, municipal planning head and co-architect Martin Wagner, garden architect Leberecht Migge and Neukölln gardens director Ottokar Wagler.

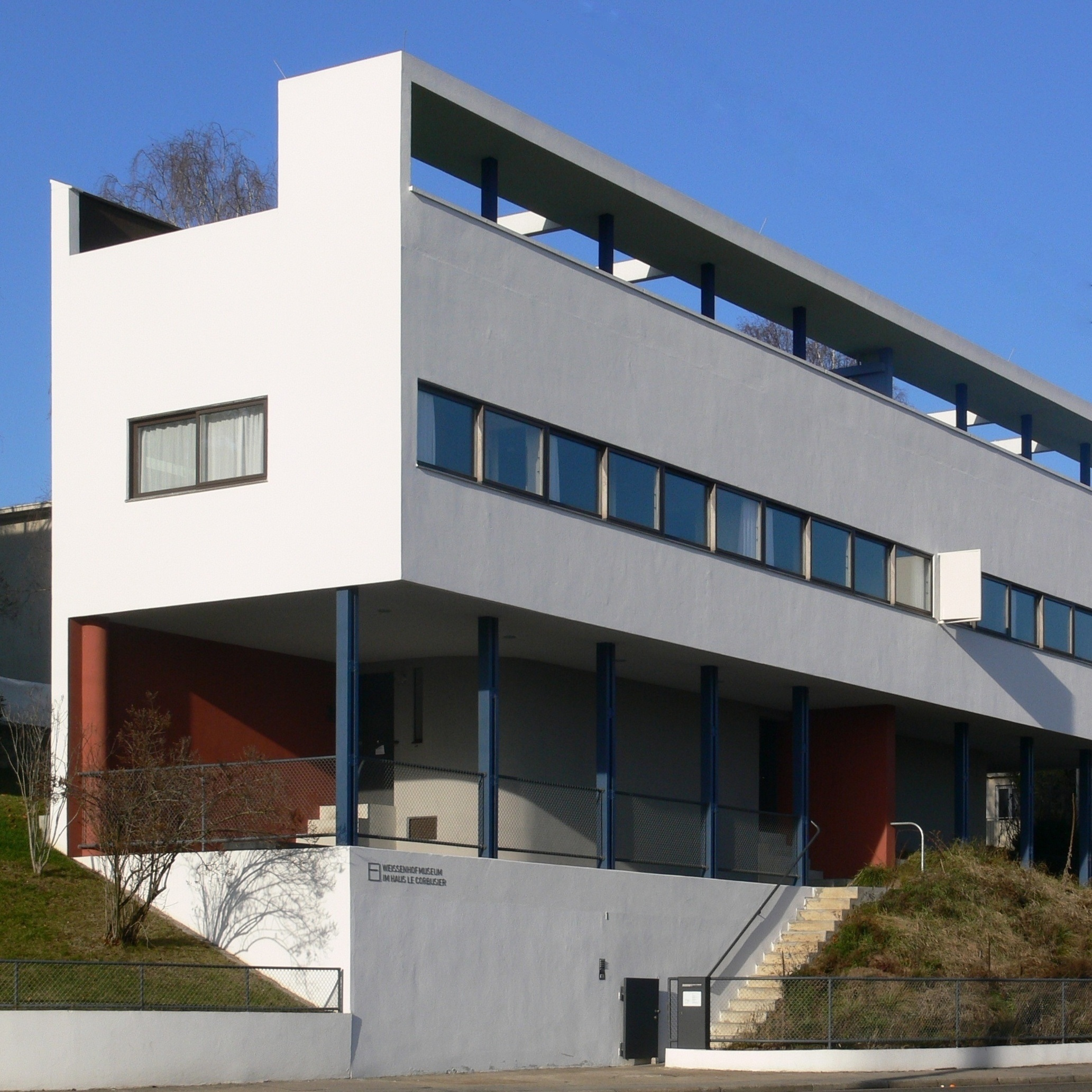
House 15 at the Weißenhofsiedlung designed by Le Corbusier and Pierre Jeanerret in 1928.

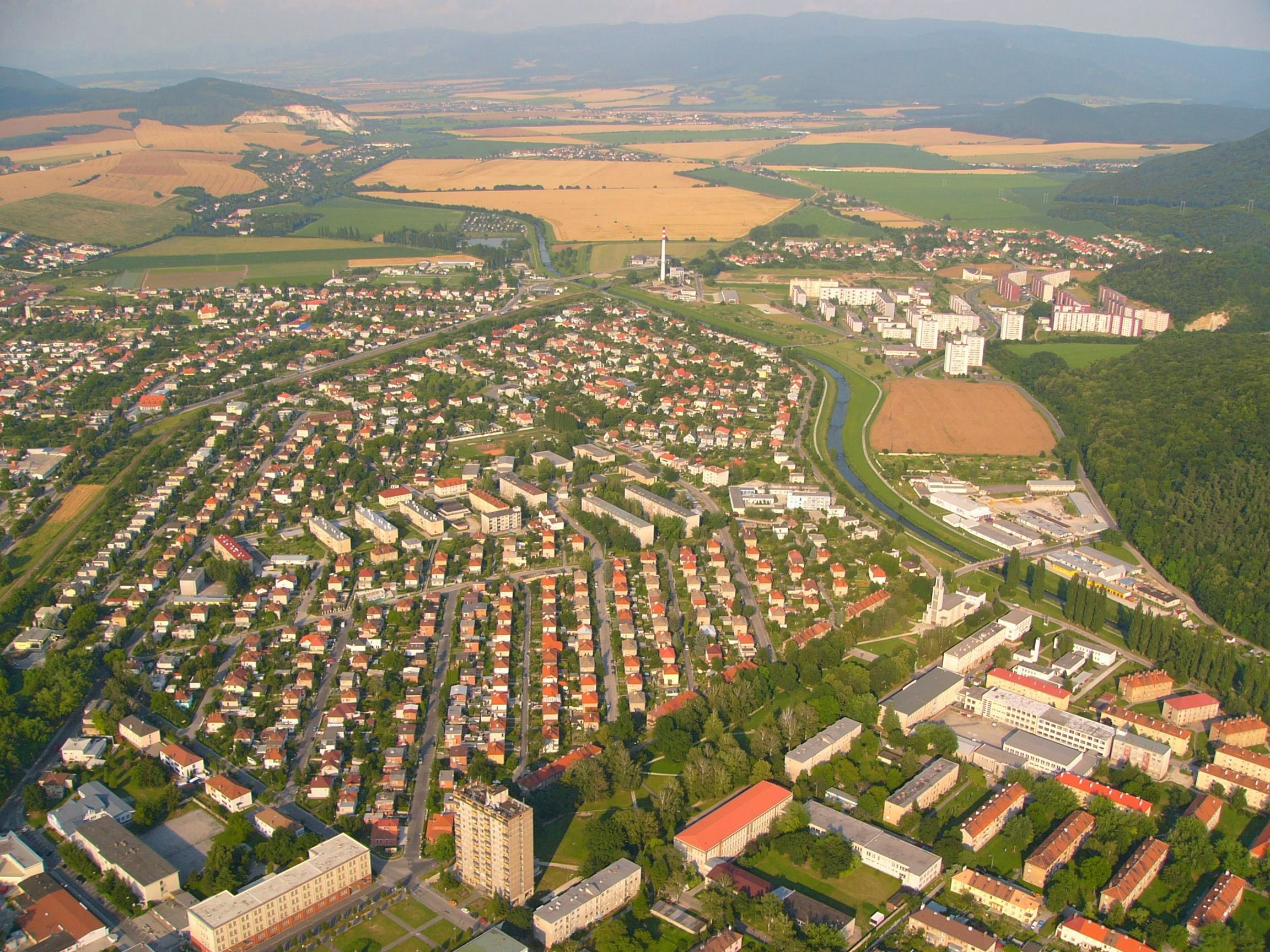
Partizánske in Slovakia – an example of a typical planned industrial city founded in 1938 together with a shoemaking factory in which practically all adult inhabitants of the city were employed.

In the 1920s, the ideas of modernism began to surface in urban planning, in particular promoted by the Congrès Internationaux d'Architecture Moderne from 1928. The influential modernist architect Le Corbusier presented his scheme for a "Contemporary City" for three million inhabitants (Ville Contemporaine) in 1922. The centrepiece of this plan was the group of sixty-story cruciform skyscrapers, steel-framed office buildings encased in huge curtain walls of glass. These skyscrapers were set within large, rectangular, park-like green spaces. At the centre was a huge transportation hub that on different levels included depots for buses and trains, as well as highway intersections, and at the top, an airport. Le Corbusier had the fanciful notion that commercial airliners would land between the huge skyscrapers. He segregated pedestrian circulation paths from the roadways and glorified the automobile as a means of transportation. As one moved out from the central skyscrapers, smaller low-story, zig-zag apartment blocks (set far back from the street amid green space) housed the inhabitants. Le Corbusier hoped that politically minded industrialists in France would lead the way with their efficient Taylorist and Fordist strategies adopted from American industrial models to re-organise society.

In 1925, Le Corbusier exhibited his Plan Voisin, in which he proposed to bulldoze most of central Paris north of the Seine and replace it with his sixty-story cruciform towers from the Contemporary City, placed within an orthogonal street grid and park-like green space. In the 1930s, Le Corbusier expanded and reformulated his ideas on urbanism, eventually publishing them in La Ville radieuse (The Radiant City) in 1935. Perhaps the most significant difference between the Contemporary City and the Radiant City is that the latter abandoned the class-based stratification of the former; housing was now assigned according to family size, not economic position. Le Corbusier's theories were sporadically adopted by the builders of public housing in Europe and the United States. Many of his disciples became notable in their own right, including painter-architect Nadir Afonso, who absorbed Le Corbusier's ideas into his own aesthetics theory. Lúcio Costa's city plan of Brasília and the industrial city of Zlín planned by František Lydie Gahura in the Czech Republic are notable plans based on his ideas, while the architect himself produced the plan for Chandigarh in India. Le Corbusier's thinking also had been profoundly affected by the philosophy of Futurism and Constructivism in Russia at the turn of the 20th century.

Concurrently to the work of Le Corbusier, in Germany under the Weimar Republic, a group of theorists group up around the Bauhaus and were actively involved in developing new housing projects in Frankfurt and other German cities including in Stuttgartt and Berlin. New Frankfurt (German: Neues Frankfurt) was an affordable public housing program in Frankfurt started in 1925 and completed in 1930. The project was initiated by Frankfurt's mayor Ludwig Landmann, who hired the architect Ernst May as a general manager of many communal departments. In Stuttgart, the Weissenhof Estate (German: Weißenhofsiedlung) is a housing estate built for the 1927 Deutscher Werkbund exhibition. It was an international showcase of modern architecture's aspiration to provide cheap, simple, efficient, and good-quality housing. Two buildings designed by Le Corbusier were designated a World Heritage Site in 2016 as part of The Architectural Work of Le Corbusier, an Outstanding Contribution to the Modern Movement.

Similarly, the Berlin Modernism Housing Estates, now a UNESCO World Heritage Site, comprising six separate subsidized housing estates in Berlin. Dating mainly from the years of the Weimar Republic (1919–1933), when the city of Berlin was particularly progressive socially, politically and culturally, they are outstanding examples of the building reform movement that contributed to improving housing and living conditions for people with low incomes through innovative approaches to architecture and urban planning. The estates also provide exceptional examples of new urban and architectural typologies, featuring fresh design solutions, as well as technical and aesthetic innovations. Bruno Taut, Martin Wagner and Walter Gropius were among the leading architects of these projects which exercised considerable influence on the development of housing around the world.

Another important theorist was Sir Patrick Geddes who understood the importance of taking the regional environment into account and the relationship between social issues and town planning, and foresaw the emergence of huge urban conurbations. In 1927, he was commissioned to plan the city of Tel Aviv, then in Mandatory Palestine. It consisted of about 40 blocks, sized around 150 metres squared. The block contained an inner small public garden, disposed into a windmill configuration of inner access roads, making it awkward for car traffic. The big blocks form a gently undulating street pattern, north–south commercial, east–west arranged to catch the sea breeze. This was a simple and efficient manner to modernise the historical fixed grid patterns. A series of shaded boulevards short cuts the system, with some public squares, accessing the sea front. The plan of the new town became a success.

Urban planning in communist countries has often modeled itself on Western modernism, using the authority of the state to implement efficient urban designs produced in administrative centers. (In Russia this process was nominally decentralized after the end of the USSR, but Moscow remains the source of much of the country's urban planning expertise.) Germany under national socialism also undertook grandiose schemes for urban redesign.

=== New Towns ===
Ebenezer Howard's urban planning concepts were only adopted on a large scale after World War II. The damage brought on by the war provoked significant public interest in what post-war Britain would be like, which was encouraged by the government, who facilitated talk about a 'Better Britain' to boost morale. Post-war rebuilding initiatives saw new plans drafted for London, which, for the first time, addressed the issue of de-centralisation. Firstly, the County of London Plan 1943 recognised that displacement of population and employment was necessary if the city was to be rebuilt at a desirable density. Moreover, the Greater London Plan of 1944 went further by suggesting that over one million people would need to be displaced into a mixture of satellite suburbs, existing rural towns, and new towns. The New Towns Act 1946 (9 & 10 Geo. 6. c. 68) resulted in many New Towns being constructed in Britain over the following decades.

In Sweden the Million Programme (Swedish: Miljonprogrammet) was a large public housing program implemented in Sweden between 1965 and 1974 by the governing Swedish Social Democratic Party to ensure the availability of affordable, high quality housing to all Swedish citizens. The program sought to construct one million new housing dwellings over a ten-year period, which it accomplished with the development of numerous new towns. France and The Netherlands undertook similar post-war growth programmes.

New towns were built in the United States from the 1960s – examples include Reston, Virginia; Columbia, Maryland; Jonathan, Minnesota and Riverside Plaza. This construction effort was combined with extensive federal government grants for slum clearance, improved and increased housing and road construction and comprehensive urban renewal projects. Other European countries such as France, Germany, Italy and Sweden also had some successes with new towns, especially as part of post-war reconstruction efforts.

== Contemporary ==
Urban planning has grown in prominence with rising urbanization.

=== Reaction against modernism ===
By the late 1960s and early 1970s, many planners felt that modernism's clean lines and lack of human scale sapped vitality from the community, blaming them for high crime rates and social problems.

Modernist planning fell into decline in the 1970s when the construction of cheap, uniform tower blocks ended in most countries, such as Britain and France. Since then many have been demolished and replaced by other housing types. Rather than attempting to eliminate all disorder, planning now concentrates on individualism and diversity in society and the economy; this is the post-modernist era.

Minimally planned cities still exist. Houston is a large city (with a metropolitan population of 5.5 million) in a developed country without a comprehensive zoning ordinance. Houston does, however, restrict development densities and mandate parking, even though specific land uses are not regulated. Also, private-sector developers in Houston use subdivision covenants and deed restrictions to effect land-use restrictions resembling zoning laws. Houston voters have rejected comprehensive zoning ordinances three times since 1948.

=== Behaviorism ===
Behaviorist psychology influenced urban planning especially in the 1960s and after, manifesting in such theories as defensible space and crime prevention through environmental design.

=== New Urbanism ===
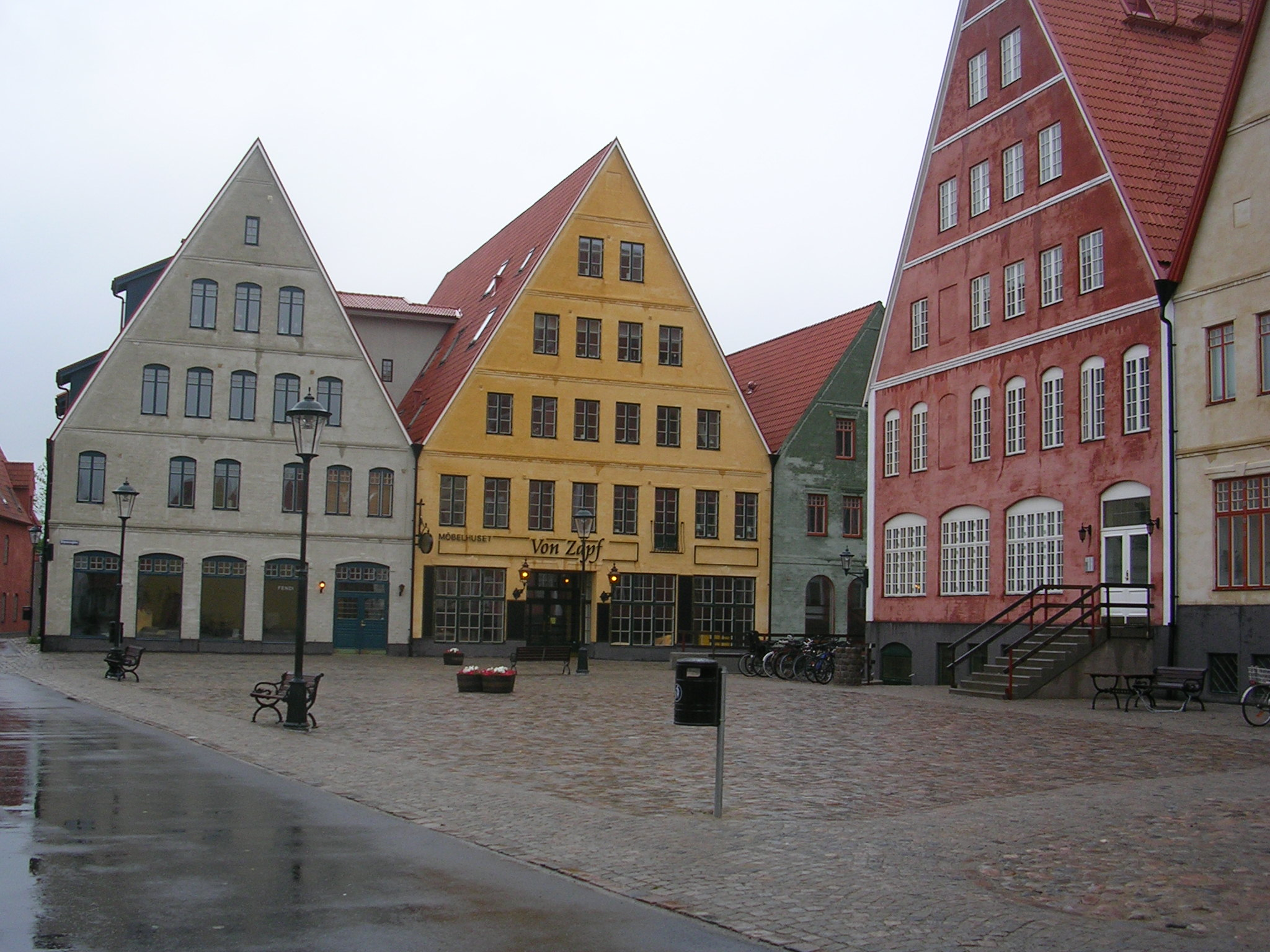
Jakriborg in Sweden, started in the late 1990s as a new urbanist eco-friendly new town near Malmö

Various current movements in urban design seek to create sustainable urban environments with long-lasting structures, buildings and a great liveability for its inhabitants. The most clearly defined form of walkable urbanism is known as the Charter of New Urbanism. It is an approach for successfully reducing environmental impacts by altering the built environment to create and preserve smart cities that support sustainable transport. Residents in compact urban neighbourhoods drive fewer miles and have significantly lower environmental impacts across a range of measures compared with those living in sprawling suburbs. The concept of Circular flow land use management has also been introduced in Europe to promote sustainable land use patterns that strive for compact cities and a reduction of greenfield land taken by urban sprawl.

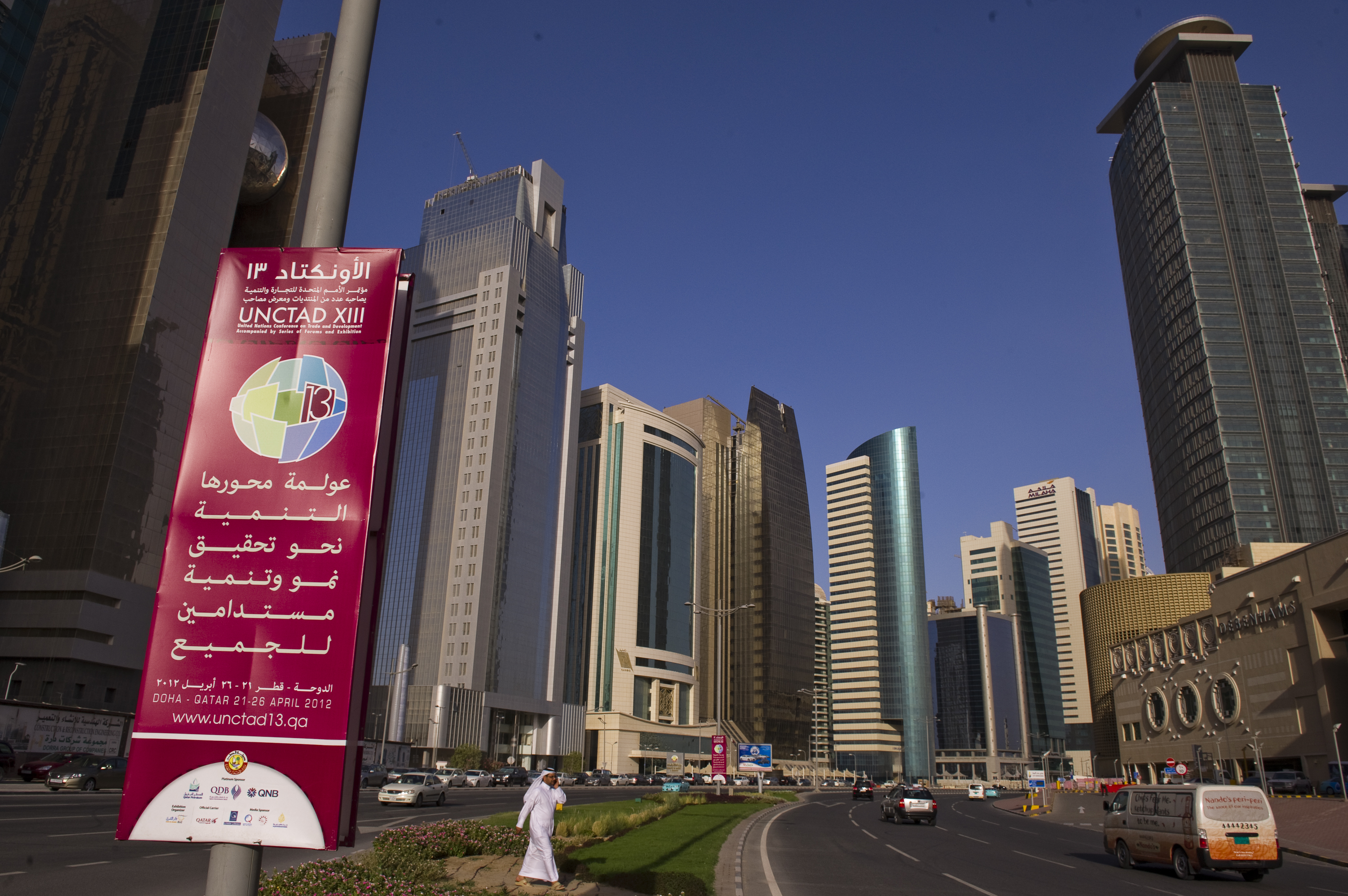
A road crossing at UNCTAD XIII in Doha, Qatar. Traffic in Qatar is separated into two roads, one serving each direction.

In sustainable construction, the recent movement of New Classical Architecture promotes a sustainable approach towards urban construction that appreciates and develops smart growth, walkability, architectural tradition, and classical design. This is in contrast to modernist and short-lived globally uniform architecture, as well as opposing solitary housing estates and suburban sprawl. Both trends started in the 1980s.

Critics of New Urbanism have argued that its environmental aspect is too focused on transport and excessive individual mobility. They say that the real problem with the unsustainable nature of modern cities is not just about cars and too much driving – it is about the entire urban metabolism of the city (of which auto-mobility is less than half of the overall ecological footprint and accounts for about half of the GHG emissions/carbon footprint). They have also argued that land-use planning can do little to achieve sustainability without regulating the design and associated technology of the actual development within a zoned area. Distances and density are relatively unimportant, they claim; it is the total metabolism of the development that determines the environmental impact. Also, they say that the emphasis needs to shift from sustainability to resilience, and the spatial scope from the city to the whole urban region. A further criticism is that the New Urbanist project of compacting urban form is a difficult and slow process. In the new global situation, with the horizontal, low-density growth irreversibly dominant, and climate change already happening, they say it would be wiser to focus efforts on the resilience of whole city-regions, retrofitting the existing sprawl for sustainability and self-sufficiency, and investing heavily in 'green infrastructure'.

=== Sustainable development and sustainability ===
Sustainable development has emerged in recent decades as guiding themes for urban planning. This term was defined and advocated in 1987 report Our Common Future, published by the World Commission on Environment and Development.

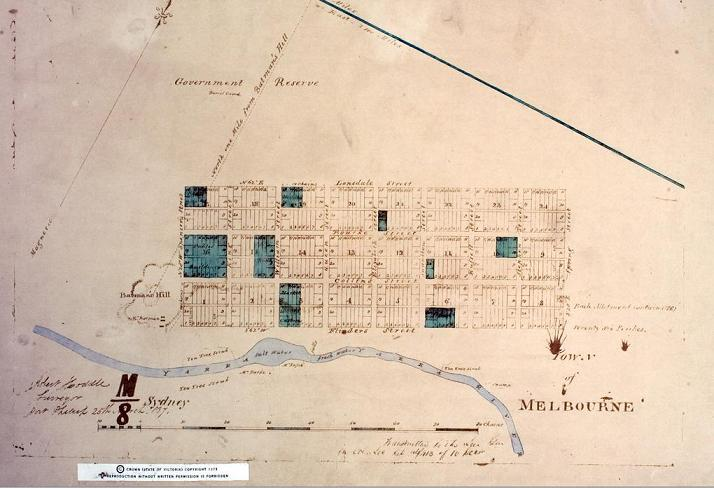
Robert Hoddle's survey of Melbourne in 1837. The layout of the city is referred to as the "Hoddle Grid".

Some planners argue that modern lifestyles use too many natural resources, polluting or destroying ecosystems, increasing social inequality, creating urban heat islands, and causing climate change. Many urban planners, therefore, advocate sustainable cities.

However, sustainable development is a recent, controversial concept. Wheeler, in his 2004 book, defines sustainable urban development as "development that improves the long-term social and ecological health of cities and towns." He sketches a 'sustainable' city's features: compact, efficient land use; less automobile use, yet better access; efficient resource use; less pollution and waste; the restoration of natural systems; good housing and living environments; a healthy social ecology; a sustainable economy; community participation and involvement; and preservation of local culture and wisdom. Urban planners are now promoting a sustainable city model, which consists of cities that are designed with consideration of environmental impacts, such as minimising the uses of energy, water, and the outputs of waste and pollution.

Because of political and governance structures in most jurisdictions, sustainable planning measures must be widely supported before they can affect institutions and regions. Actual implementation is often a complex compromise.

Nature in cities Often an integral party of sustainable cities is the Incorporation of nature within a city.

Car free sustainability in city planning can include large pedestrian zones or be a totally Car free.

=== Collaborative planning in the United States ===
Collaborative planning arose in the US in response to the inadequacy of traditional public participation techniques to provide real opportunities for the public to make decisions affecting their communities. Collaborative planning is a method designed to empower stakeholders by elevating them to the level of decision-makers through direct engagement and dialogue between stakeholders and public agencies, to solicit ideas, active involvement, and participation in the community planning process. Active public involvement can help planners achieve better outcomes by making them aware of the public's needs and preferences and by using local knowledge to inform projects. When properly administered, collaboration can result in more meaningful participation and better, more creative outcomes to persistent problems than traditional participation methods. It enables planners to make decisions that reflect community needs and values, it fosters faith in the wisdom and utility of the resulting project, and the community is given a personal stake in its success.

Experiences in Portland and Seattle have demonstrated that successful collaborative planning depends on a number of interrelated factors: the process must be truly inclusive, with all stakeholders and affected groups invited to the table; the community must have final decision-making authority; full government commitment (of both financial and intellectual resources) must be manifest; participants should be given clear objectives by planning staff, who facilitate the process by providing guidance, consultancy, expert opinions, and research; and facilitators should be trained in conflict resolution and community organisation.

== See also ==
- Index of urban planning articles
- Urban planning in Nazi Germany
- Urban planning in communist countries
- Sanitary movement
