= E. Douglas Hume =

British science writer (1874–1950)

- Born: Ethel Douglas Hume; 4 May 1874; Batticaloa, Ceylon
- Died: 16 July 1950 (aged 76); Woodford, Essex, England
- Occupation: Writer
- Spouse: Hedley Thomson

Ethel Douglas Hume (4 May 1874 – 16 July 1950) was a British anti-vivisectionist, animal welfare writer and traveller. She is best known for authoring a controversial book in 1923 which accused Louis Pasteur of plagiarizing Antoine Béchamp's theories.

== Biography ==
Hume was born in Batticaloa, Ceylon. She was educated in Germany, Italy and London. She lived in Canada for a year and travelled to the Malay Peninsula and to Japan. A wide traveller, Hume lived in Bristol, Japan and Scotland. She later settled in Essex. She also travelled to North Africa and throughout Europe. She married Hedley Thomson.

Hume authored the controversial Bechamp or Pasteur? A Lost Chapter in the History of Biology, in 1923. The book went through many editions and reprints. Hume argued that Louis Pasteur plagiarized Antoine Béchamp's theories. The book was based on the manuscripts of Montague Leverson. Hume's book has been cited by proponents of alternative medicine but was criticized by historians. Early reviewers were not aware that Hume was female.

In 1924, a review in the Nature journal commented that "the solid fact remains that most of [Béchamp's] work has been discredited as inaccurate, and although he wrote an immense amount, he plunged deeper and deeper into error. However high the opinion of the author is on the virtues of Bechamp, he has utilised a fair part of the book to exploit his own antimicrobic and antivaccination views." In 1928, William Fearon stated that the book "is written in a somewhat peevish style, and appears to be more concerned with the defects of Pasteur than the merits of Bechamp". In 1934, a review in The Quarterly Review of Biology dismissed the book as a "bit of anti-vivisection and anti-vaccination propaganda". A review in the Isis journal the same year, described the book as an attack upon Pasteur and to discredit vaccination. The review concluded that "the emotional basis, the intellectual feebleness, and the anti-scientific and anti-social character of the whole anti-medical movement is superbly illustrated in the motivation and in the pseudo-scientific and ofttimes painfully unintelligent content of this subsidized book of propaganda."

Hume's book was republished as Pasteur Exposed: The False Foundations of Modern Science (1989). Historian Gerald L. Geison wrote that although the book does reveal that Pasteur treated Antoine Béchamp "very shabbily... it does not persuade me that Pasteur "plagiarized" Béchamp's work and ideas in any meaningful sense of the term."

Hume was an anti-vaccinationist and germ theory denialist. In 1933, Hume commented that cholera, dysentery and enteric are evidence of bad sanitation and bad water supply and do not prove the germ theory of disease.

== Animal welfare ==
Hume was an anti-vivisectionist and supporter of animal welfare. She authored The Mind-Changers, a book which documented the history of the changing public opinion on treatment of animals. It contains biographical sketches of pioneers against animal cruelty. Prince Christopher wrote the foreword and George Arliss wrote the introduction. In 1919, Hume lectured on "Hydrophobia and the Mad Dog Scare" for the London and Provincial Anti-Vivisection Society. Hume was a vegetarian and associated with the Bristol Vegetarian and Health Culture Society.

== Selected publications ==
- The Globular Jottings of Griselda (1907)
- The Multiplicities of Una (1911)
- Life's Primal Architects: An Essay on the Bacteriological Work of Antoine Béchamp (1915)
- Béchamp or Pasteur? A Lost Chapter in the History of Biology (1932 edition, first published 1923)
- The Mind-Changers (1939)
