= Béchamp reduction =

Chemical reaction converting nitro compounds

Bechamp reduction
Named after	Antoine Béchamp
Reaction type	Organic redox reaction

Identifiers
RSC ontology ID	RXNO:0000498

The Béchamp reduction (or Béchamp process) is a chemical reaction that converts aromatic nitro compounds to their corresponding anilines using iron as the reductant:

4 C_{6}H_{5}NO_{2} + 9 Fe + 4 H_{2}O → 4 C_{6}H_{5}NH_{2} + 3 Fe_{3}O_{4}

This reaction was once a major route to aniline, but hydrogenation of nitrobenzene using palladium on charcoal is now the preferred method.

== Reaction history and scope ==
The reaction was first used by Antoine Béchamp to reduce 2-nitronaphthalene and nitrobenzene to 2-naphthylamine and aniline, respectively. The Béchamp reduction is broadly applicable to aromatic nitro compounds.

The reduction proceeds in a multistep manner. Nitroso and hydroxylamino arenes are intermediates. The process requires both electrons from the iron and protons from the solvent.

The reaction is not applicable to Aliphatic nitro compounds. Instead reduction of alkyl nitro compounds stops at the hydroxylamine stage. Tertiary aliphatic nitro compounds, however, are converted in good yield to amines.

== Laux process ==
The traditional Béchamp reduction cogenerates gray-black iron oxides. The Laux process is based on the finding that the oxide coproduct is strongly affected by various additives, such as ferrous chloride, aluminium chloride, and even simply sulfuric acid. The innovations from Laux have shifted the emphasis of the Béchamp reduction for the manufacture of anilines to the production of valuable iron oxide pigments.
