= Anti-Vaccination Society of America =

Defunct public policy organization

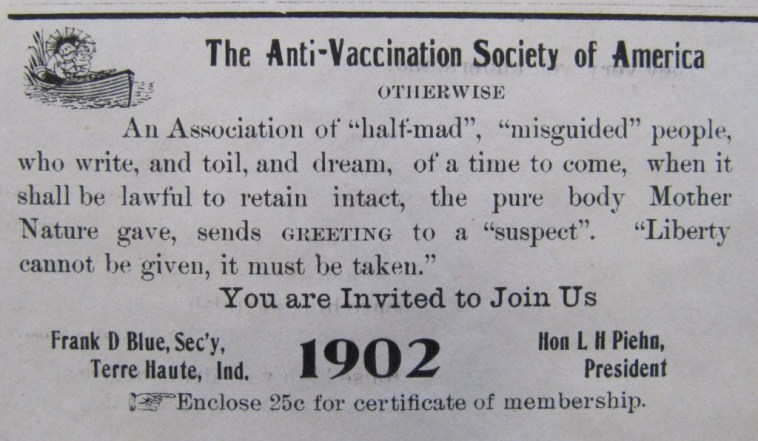
Anti-Vaccination Society of America advertisement from 1902

Anti-Vaccination Society of America opposed compulsory smallpox vaccination from the final decades of the 19th century through the 1910s. It was founded in 1879 after a visit to the United States by William Tebb. It published a periodical called Vaccination.

== Members ==
- William Tebb (1830–1917) inspired the organization.
- L.H. Piehn of Nora Springs, Iowa. He was a banker and his daughter died of sepsis after the smallpox vaccine in 1894.
- Montague Leverson of New York City.
- Weyprecht of New York City in 1895.
- Frank D. Blue of Terre Haute, Indiana was secretary in 1899.
- Porter F. Cope (1869–1950) was the secretary.
- E. C. Townsend of New York City was assistant secretary for the Eastern States. He was the publisher of Anti-Vaccination News.

== Renewed Society ==
=== Back Again ===
After previously dying out, the Anti-Vaccination Society of America would be renewed in 1895, under the same Charter as the previous. New York City Lawyer E. H. Ben would become the Vice President as an advocate against vaccination.

The main focus of the renewed Anti-Vaccination Society of America was that of compulsory vaccination. Members of the newly renewed group included New York City Dr. R. A. Gunn and Dr. Alexander Wilder of Newark, New Jersey. These individuals expressed the belief that those whom supported compulsory vaccination only did so to profit off of the vaccination.

=== More than Smallpox ===
This reformation included a broader focus outside of simply vaccination from smallpox. The death of a young Pennsylvanian man, Joseph Golde, following a Tetanus vaccination incited the Anti-Vaccination Society of America to demand an investigation.

In addition to this the society focused on repealing mandatory vaccination for students and teachers in pubic schools following the dismissal of a teacher from her position after refusing to become vaccinated. Dr. John J. Cronin of the Bureau of Child Hygiene and Charles M. Higgins, Treasurer of the Anti-Vaccination Society of America, urged parents to not have their children vaccinated. Their reasoning behind this, in the advertisements they distributed, was that mandatory vaccination only existed for the benefit of those who were involved in producing and distributing the vaccines.

=== Opposition ===
In New York City, Board of Health Commissioner S. S. Goldwater pushed back against the Anti-Vaccination Society stating the significantly reduced cases of Small Pox in New York City. Goldwater pushed the narrative that the claims of the harm caused by vaccination, as cited by the Anti-Vaccination Society, failed to include citations for their claims.

== See also ==
- Anti-Vaccination League of America
- National Anti-Vaccination League
