= Germ theory denialism =

Pseudoscientific belief that germs do not cause disease

Germ theory denialism is the pseudoscientific belief that germs do not cause infectious disease, and that the germ theory of disease is wrong. It usually involves arguing that Louis Pasteur's model of infectious disease was wrong, and that Antoine Béchamp's was right. In fact, its origins are rooted in Béchamp's empirically disproven (in the context of disease) theory of pleomorphism. Another obsolete variation is known as terrain theory and postulates that germs morphologically change in response to environmental factors, subsequently causing disease, rather than germs being the sole cause of it.

== History ==
Germ theory denialism is as old as germ theory itself, beginning with the rivalry of Pasteur and Béchamp. Pasteur's work in preventing beverage contamination led him to discover that it was due to microorganisms and led him to become the first scientist to prove the validity of the theory and to popularize it in Europe. Before him, scientists such as Girolamo Fracastoro (who had the idea that fomites could harbor the seeds of contagion), Agostino Bassi (who discovered that the muscardine disease of silkworms was caused by a fungus that was named Beauveria bassiana), Friedrich Henle (who developed the concepts of contagium vivum and contagium animatum), and others had proposed ideas similar to germ theory.

Béchamp strongly contested Pasteur's view, proposing a competing idea known as the pleomorphic theory of disease. This theory says that all life is based on forms that a certain class of organisms takes during stages of their life cycles and that germs are attracted to the environment of diseased tissue rather than being the cause of it. Proponents of this idea insist that microbes that live in an organism go through the same stages of their development. According to Günther Enderlein, the stages are as follows:

- colloid – microbe (primitive phase)
- bacteria (middle phase)
- fungus (end phase)

Related to this is the disproven premise that viruses are the result of bodily damage caused by unwholesome habits or lifestyle.

Mary Baker Eddy, founder of the Christian Science church, was another prominent germ theory denialist. When asked in an interview by the New York Herald whether she "reject[ed] utterly the bacteria theory of the propagation of disease", she replied, "Entirely", adding, "If I harbored that idea about a disease, I should think myself in danger of catching it". Christian Scientists deny the material reality of disease and rely solely on prayer for healing.

=== Terrain theory ===
The terrain theory is a variation of Béchamp's ideas that is also an obsolete medical theory that held that diseases were caused by the composition of the body. The "terrain" will attract germs to come as scavengers of the weakened or poorly defended tissue. Béchamp believed that the pH of the body is important, and that an acidic pH will attract germs and an alkaline pH will repel them.

While understanding the causes of sickness does not always immediately lead to effective treatment, the great decline in mortality during the 19th century stemmed from preventing the transmission of pathogens through improvements in hygiene and sanitation. In fact, one of the first movements to deny the germ theory, the Sanitary Movement, was nevertheless central in developing America's public health infrastructure. Providing clean water and sanitation reduced the environment for pathogens to develop, and mortality rates fell dramatically.

== Status ==
Germ theory denialism is counter to over a century of experiments and practical observations, and the prevailing opinion of almost all doctors and scientists.

A common thread among many alternative medicine proponents is opposition to vaccines, and some use their disbelief in germ theory to justify their claims. Germ theory deniers make many claims about the biological underpinnings of the theory and the historical record that are at odds with what most modern scientists and historians accept. Another claim from the anti-vaccine community involves the theory that all diseases are caused by toxins due to inadequate diet and health practices.

== See also ==
- COVID-19 misinformation
- HIV/AIDS denialism
- Hygiene hypothesis
- Pleomorphism (microbiology)
- Vaccine hesitancy

- Category:Germ theory denialists
