= Bassing =

- Commune
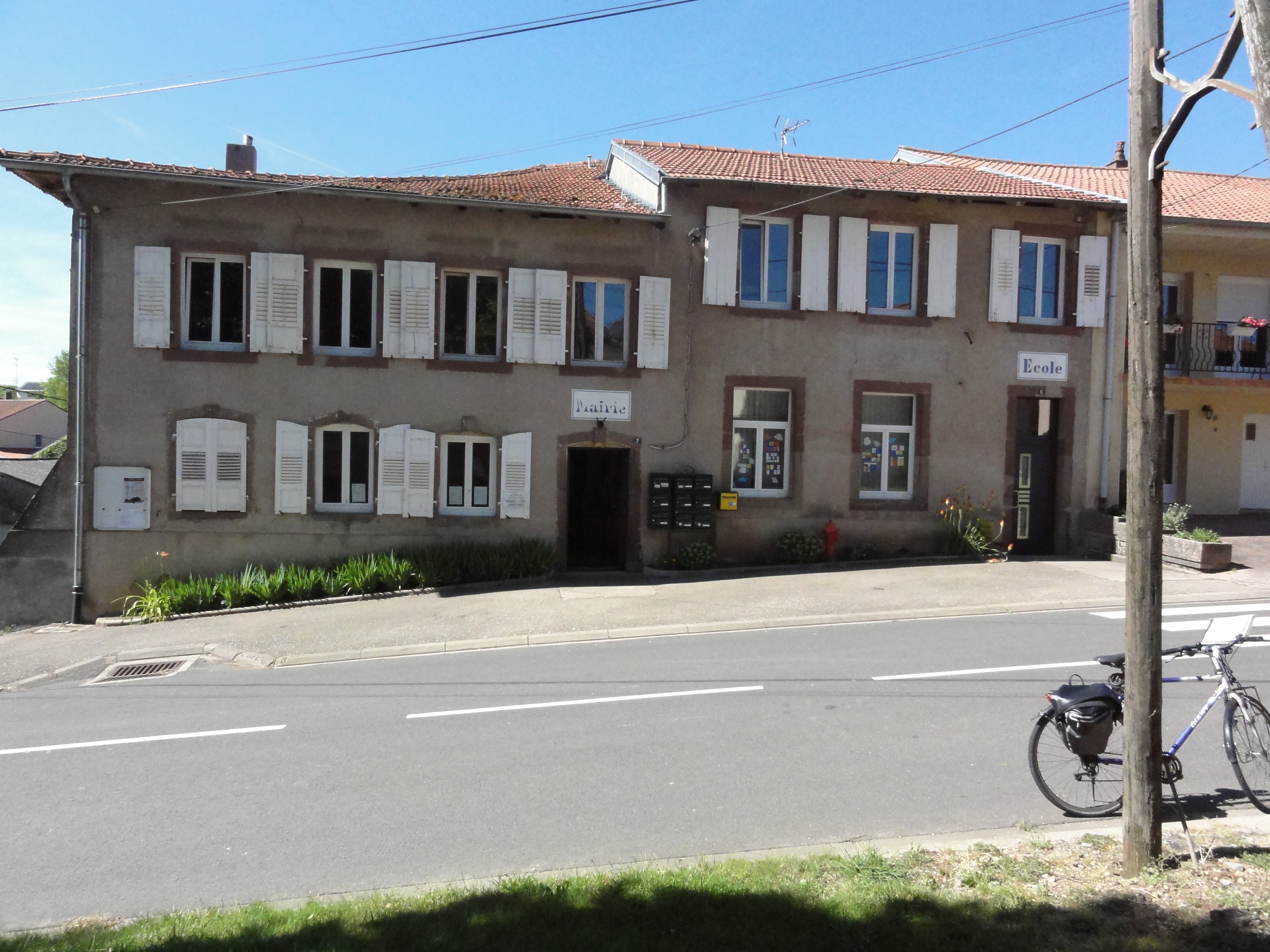
- The town hall and school in Bassing

- Coat of arms
- Location of Bassing
- Location within France Location within Grand Est
- Coordinates: 48°52′10″N 6°48′09″E
- Country: France
- Region: Grand Est
- Department: Moselle
- Arrondissement: Sarrebourg-Château-Salins
- Canton: Le Saulnois
- Intercommunality: CC Saulnois

Government
  - Mayor (2020–2026): Christian Legrand
- Area^{1}: 6.3 km^{2} (2.4 sq mi)
- Elevation: 240 m (790 ft)
- Highest elevation: 283 m (928 ft)
- Lowest elevation: 220 m (720 ft)
- Population (2023): 106
  - Density: 17/km^{2} (44/sq mi)
- Time zone: UTC+01:00 (CET)
  - Summer (DST): UTC+02:00 (CEST)
- INSEE/Postal code: 57053 /57260
- ^{1} French Land Register data, which excludes lakes, ponds, glaciers > 1 km^{2} (0.386 sq mi or 247 acres) and river estuaries.

Bassing (French pronunciation: [basɛ̃]; German: Bessingen) is a commune in the Moselle department in Grand Est in northeastern France.

== History ==
Previous names: Bessingen (1267), Bassigen (1267), Bessing (1553), Bensingen (1594), Bestingen (1665).

== Population ==
Historical population
Year	Pop.	±% p.a.
1968	139	—
1975	123	−1.73%
1982	108	−1.84%
1990	132	+2.54%
1999	142	+0.81%
2007	138	−0.36%
2012	121	−2.59%
2017	119	−0.33%
2023	106	−1.91%
Source: INSEE

== See also ==
- Communes of the Moselle department
