= Circular flow land use management =

Process in which neglected land in urban areas is put to better uses

Circular flow land use management, or CircUse, is a name for a particular process in which neglected land in urban areas is put to better uses. CircUse as a concept aims to be integrated with existing structures and uses, and is put into practice on a broad scale. The concept also looks to reduce the consumption of un-built land through prioritizing inner development over outer development. In Germany the approach of circular flow land use management has been developed and tested by the German Institute for Urban Affairs (Deutsches Institut für Urbanistik) on behalf of the German Federal Ministry of Transport, Building and Urban Affairs (BMVBS) and German Federal Office for Building and Regional Planning (BBR).

== Concept of Land Use ==
The concept of circular flow land use management can be described with the slogan “reduce – recycle – avoid”. To create sustainable land uses, actions have to be supported to find new innovative ways to “reduce” the consumption of land by new development “recycle” or put back into use abandoned and derelict sites, and “avoid” future land use decisions that are not sustainable. The concept puts a high value upon the development of inner districts through infill measures. This approach takes into consideration issues related to urban sprawl, urban planning, brownfield land, and land use planning. The concept was developed by the German Institute for Urban Affairs (Difu) and the Federal Office for Building and Regional Planning (BBR) between 2003 and 2007 during the ExWoSt research field “circular land use management in cities and urban regions” (Kreislaufwirtschaft in der städtischen/stadtregionalen Flächennuntzung -. Fläche im Kreis)

== Practical application ==
To incorporate the circular flow land use management concept into the practice of city planning in Central Europe, the project “Circular Flow Land Use Management (CircUse)” was initiated by the European Union Central Europe organization as well as co-financed by the European Regional Development Fund. The CircUse project involves 12 partner organizations and 3 associated organizations in the six countries of Austria, Czech Republic, Germany, Italy, Poland and Slovakia. The lead organization is the Institute for the Ecology of Urban Areas (IETU), located in Katowice, Poland. The main core outputs of the CircUse project will be:

- A Circular Flow Land Use Management Strategy
- Position paper on existing and new instruments
- Separate training materials for professionals and school children
- Management structures (one newly formed and another modified from its previous form) that incorporate the CircUse principles
- Developed action plans for six pilot regions
- A land management data tool available as a software package
- A compendium summarizing the entire project

== Timeframe ==
The CircUse project was initiated in March 2010 and is scheduled to run until the end of February 2013.

== Similar projects ==
CircUse also builds on the experiences the German "ExWoSt Research Field: Circular land use management in cities and urban regions” (ExWoSt Themafeld: Kreislaufwirtschaft in der städtischen/stadtregionalen Flächennutzung) and the German Federal Ministry of Education and Research (BMBF) Research Programme "Research for the Reduction of Land Consumption and for Sustainable Land Management" (Forschung für die Reduzierung der Flächeninanspruchnahme und ein nachhaltiges Flächenmanagement). Similar projects carried out by other organizations include the European Union PLUREL project.
