= Sanitary movement =

19th-century push to improve urban sanitation in the UK and US

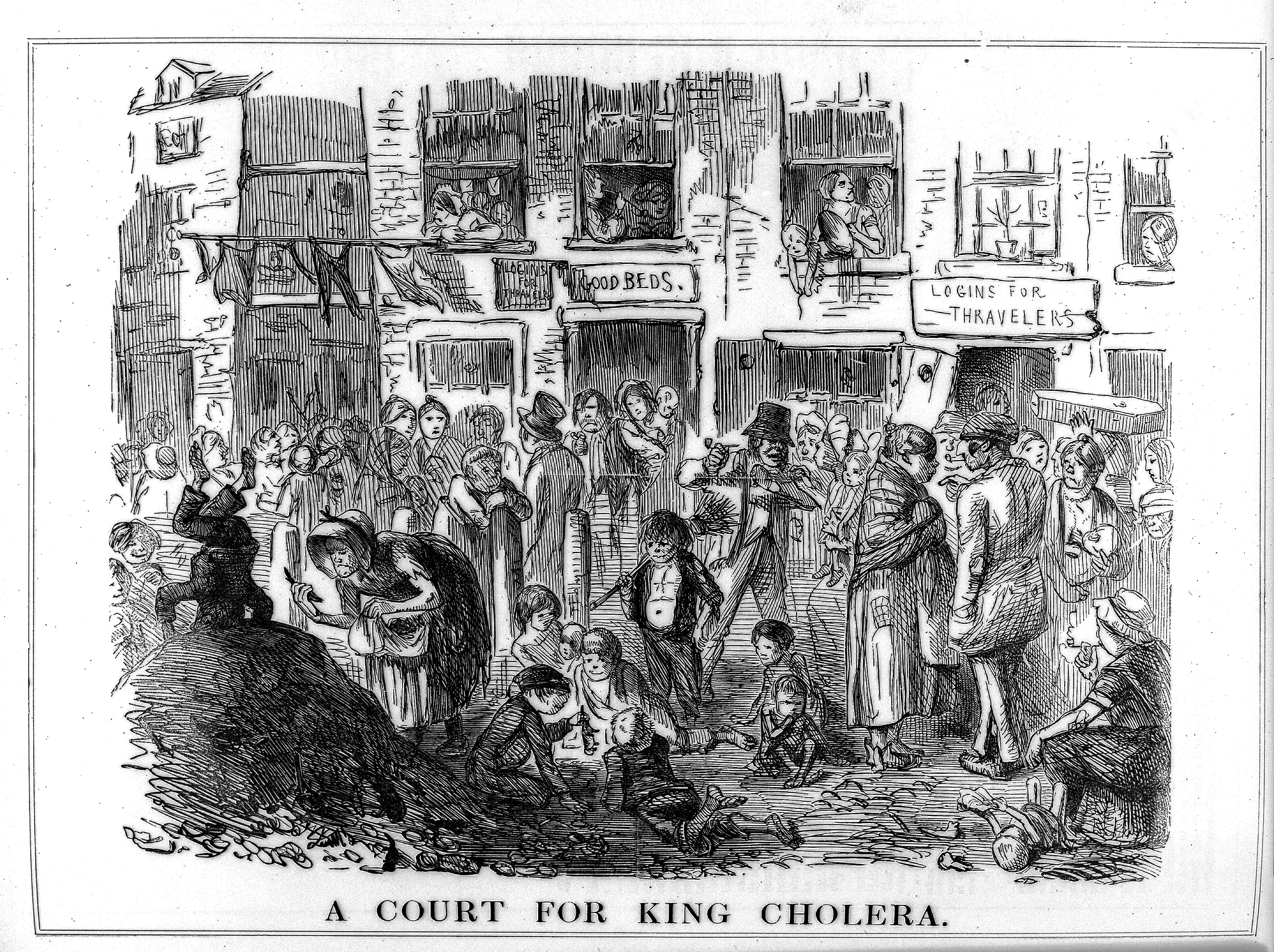
Members of the sanitary movement believed that cholera and other diseases were spread by miasma generated by overcrowding in cities.

The sanitary movement of urban planning began in the United Kingdom in 1838, with the Central Poor Law Commission's findings on the "physical causes of fever in the Metropolis which might be prevented by proper sanitary measures". Basing its sanitation beliefs on miasma theory (as opposed to germ theory), its agenda was based on the construction of sewage systems, street-paving, and the provision of clean water. The movement spread to the United States in the 1840s, reaching its peak in 1880 before declining in the 1890s. Edwin Chadwick played a major part in inspiring the movement. While the sanitary movement never theorized about the model city or urban design, as it was only interested in cities due to their environmental importance for disease, the movement did nevertheless spur a 'townsite consciousness' about certain general principles that cities should follow. These included an open and green setting without crowding or congestion, with access to clean air, water, and exercise opportunities, as well as not having dark and unventilated buildings or polluting industries in built-up areas.

== Believed Causes of Disease ==
The amount of miasma in a childhood environment was believed to determine health. Poor hygiene conditions where kids grew up resulted in a negative toll on their health. This included dirty drain systems, filthy privies, contaminated water supplies, and little access to simple hygiene supplies. Children living in this toxic environment became physically weak and fragile. A child’s health was determined if they lived in such a manner.

Dead body corpses were another accepted way to acquire disease. Fever and smallpox were illnesses people claimed to have gotten after visiting the remains of a body that died from that disease. Dr. Williams took part in a case where four students got smallpox from the dead body of a man who had the disease. During the dissection, one student saw the body, while two others went near it. The final student touched the infected body. Despite the different contacts with the body, all four students got smallpox. This led people to believe the diseased air all four were exposed to caused the sickness. Sir Benjamin Brodie claimed there were incidents where students received the disease just after being exposed to the fumes of the corpse.

Since graveyards were full of corpses, they were associated with disease as well. A surgeon for the Stepney Union, Mr. Barnett, studied the effects on people who lived near graveyards. He explained that they frequently became sick showing symptoms like weakness, depression, weak heartbeat, and issues with the vascular and nervous system. He believed there could only be one cause, the toxic air coming from the graveyard. Barnett mentions an incident that occurred when a coffin was opened in the church-yard. Putrid gases rose and infected many present at the graveyard as they fainted from the fumes. This strengthened the evidence that toxic air caused disease.

The Montfaucon was a waste site dedicated to decomposing dead horse bodies. This location was also often used by doctors in nearby hospitals to support the miasma theory. Dr. Henry Bennett, who was a house surgeon at St. Louis, believed it was the reason for surges in disease at the hospital. He claimed on multiple occasions that when the wind was blowing from Montfaucon to St. Louis, his patients’ health deteriorated. Many of their wounds and sores were exacerbated by the presence of the bad air. M. Jobert, another surgeon at the same hospital, also witnessed hospital gangrene, a rapid spreading infection, transmitted to people in the building. He believed the cause was the putrid air coming from the Montfaucon, since the cases occurred when the wind was blowing to the hospital. The reputation the hospital St. Louis had for disease epidemics became constantly associated with its proximity to Montfaucon and the foul air.

All the evidence collected helped create solutions for the sanitary movement. Since people believed that disease came from toxic bad air, they became aware enough to create reformations to prevent illness. This resulted in more advances in the Sanitary Movement.

== See also ==
- History of urban planning
- Sanitation
- History of water supply and sanitation
- History of public health
