= Marie Louis Victor Galippe =

French microbiologist and physician (1848–1922)

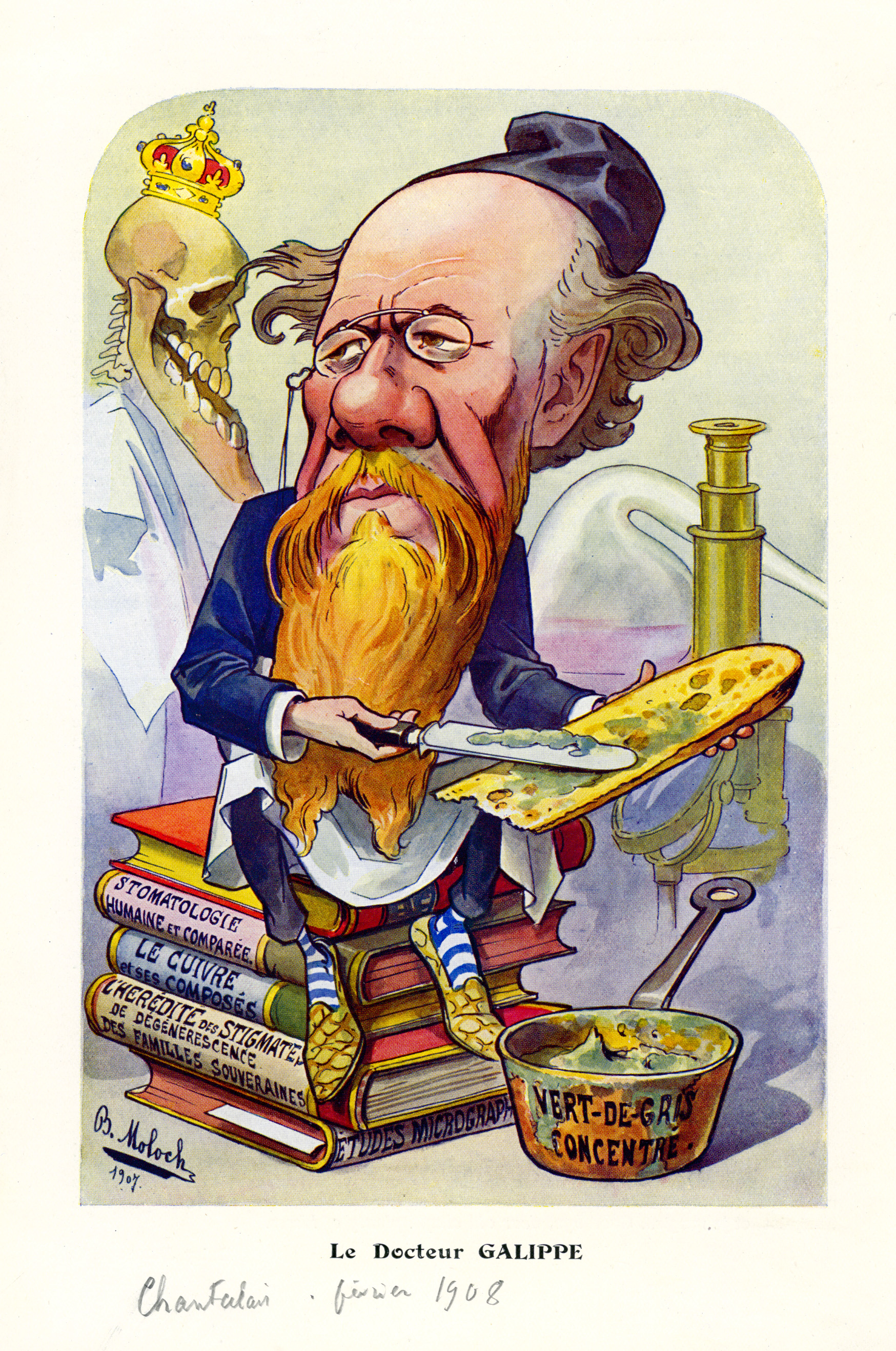
Caricature of Dr Victor Galippe by Hector Moloch, 1908

Marie Louis Victor Galippe (29 May 1848 – February 1922, Auteuil) was a French microbiologist and an eminent physician. He conducted experiments on microbiology in human life and also published notes on a variety of subjects including dental hygiene.

Born to a pharmacist in Grandvilliers, he studied at the Ecole Supérieure de Pharmacie and became a pharmacist before going on to study medicine. He demonstrated by experimenting on himself that copper sulphate was not as toxic as thought. He later made studies on bacteriology and specialized in dental health.

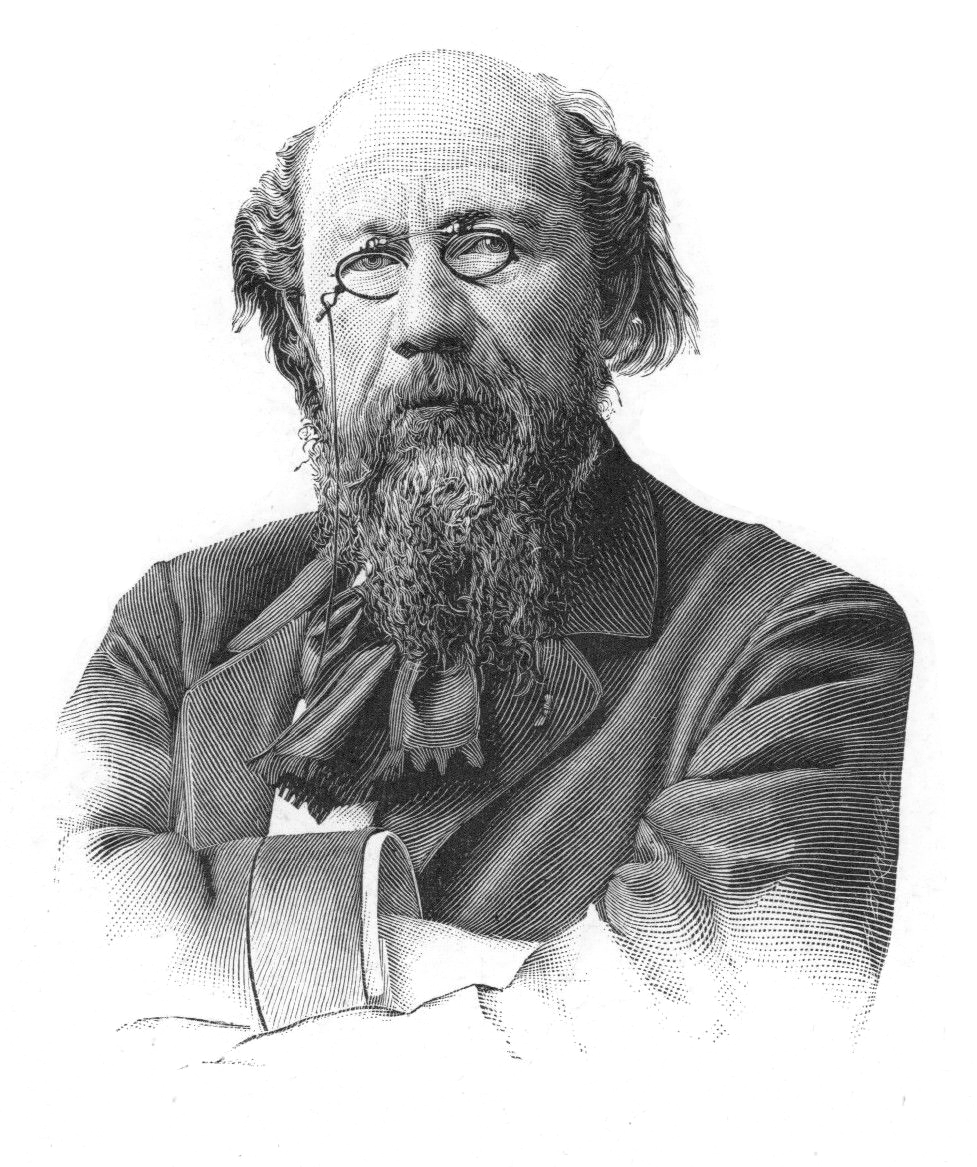
Portrait c. 1903

Among his other studies, Galippe examined bacteria present in various parts of cultivated food plants and found them to be nearly always present. He tried growing vegetables with sewage and then cut the plant parts above ground and tested them for bacteria by culturing them. Galippe discovered that the bacteria in the sewage entered the plant tissues in a number of species and found that garlic tissues were free of bacteria. Galippe also examined micro-organisms preserved within fossil bearing amber.

Galippe recovered bacteria from gallstones and hypothesized that they were produced by bacteria. His theory of bacterial gallstone production however has gained little support although viable bacteria have been found within stones even in later studies.
