= Tactical urbanism =

Low-cost, temporary improvement to a city

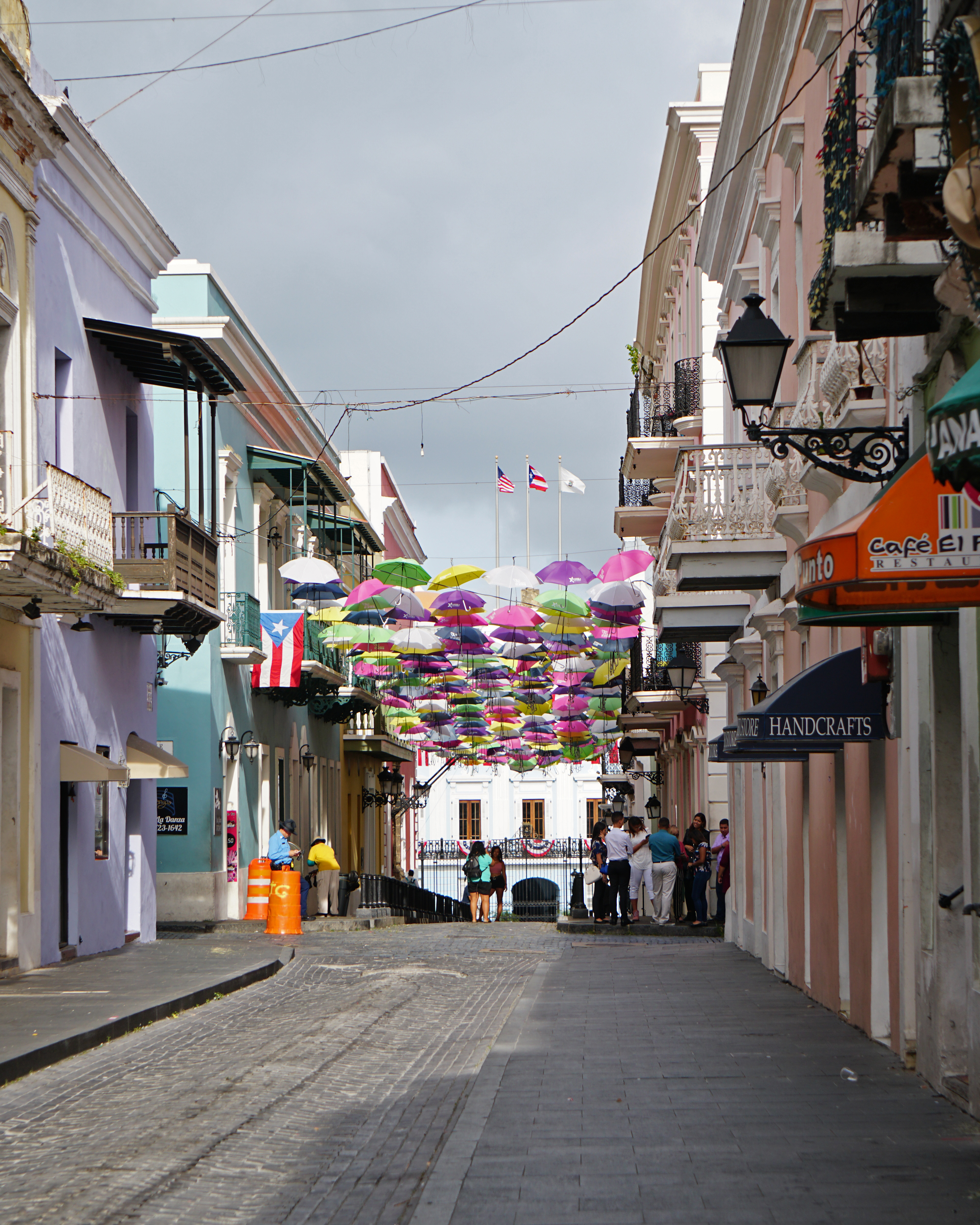
Inexpensive street decoration and shade cover, Old San Juan, Puerto Rico

Tactical urbanism (also referred to as guerrilla urbanism, pop-up urbanism, city repair, D.I.Y. urbanism, planning-by-doing, urban acupuncture, and urban prototyping) is a low-cost, temporary change to the built environment, usually in cities, intended to improve local neighbourhoods and city gathering places.

Tactical urbanism is often citizen-led but can also be initiated by government entities. Community-led temporary installations are often intended to pressure government agencies into installing a more permanent or expensive version of the improvement.

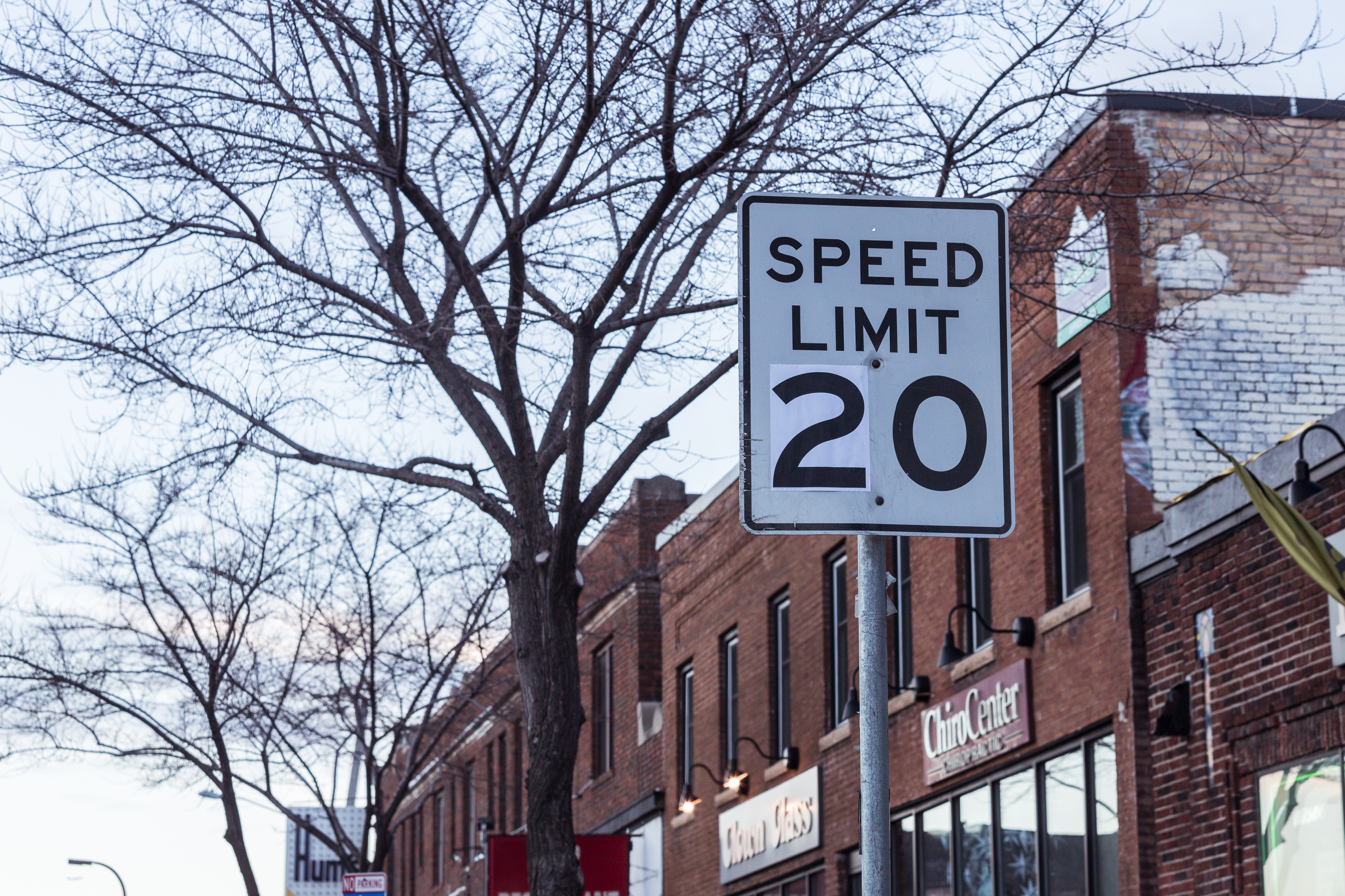
Lowering speed limits by defacing signs is a form of tactical urbanism

== Terminology ==
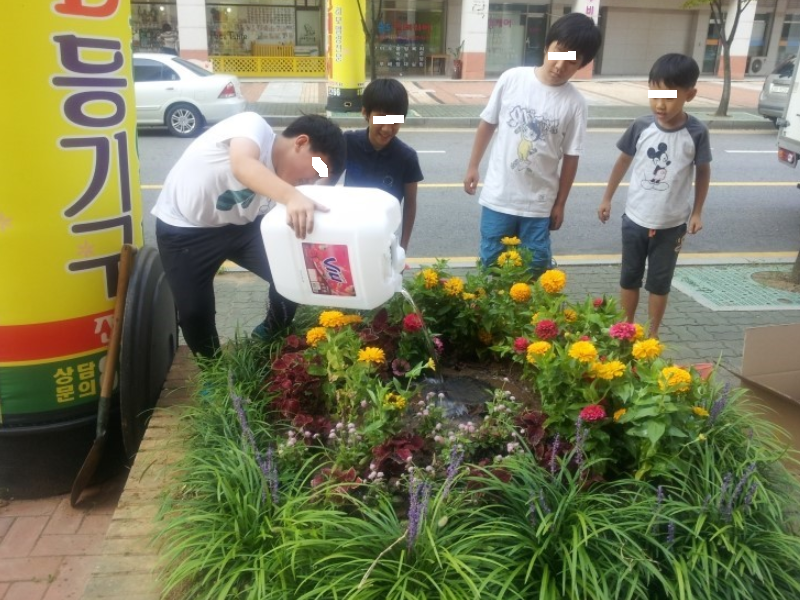
Guerrilla gardening in Incheon, Korea

The term was popularized around 2010 to refer to a range of existing techniques. The Street Plans Collaborative defines "tactical urbanism" as an approach to urban change that features five characteristics:

- A deliberate, phased approach to instigating change;
- The offering of local solutions for local planning challenges;
- Short-term commitment as a first step towards longer-term change;
- Lower risk, with potentially high rewards; and
- The development of social capital between citizens and the building of organizational capacity between public and private institutions, non-profits, and their constituents.

While the 1984 English translation of The Practice of Everyday Life by French author Michel de Certeau used the term tactical urbanism, this was in reference to events occurring in Paris in 1968; the "tactical urbanism" that Certeau described was in opposition to "strategic urbanism", which modern concepts of tactical urbanism tend not to distinguish. The modern sense of the term is attributed to New York-based urban planner Mike Lydon.

The Project for Public Spaces uses the phrase "Lighter, Quicker, Cheaper", coined by urban designer Eric Reynolds, to describe the same basic approach expressed by tactical urbanism.

== Origin ==
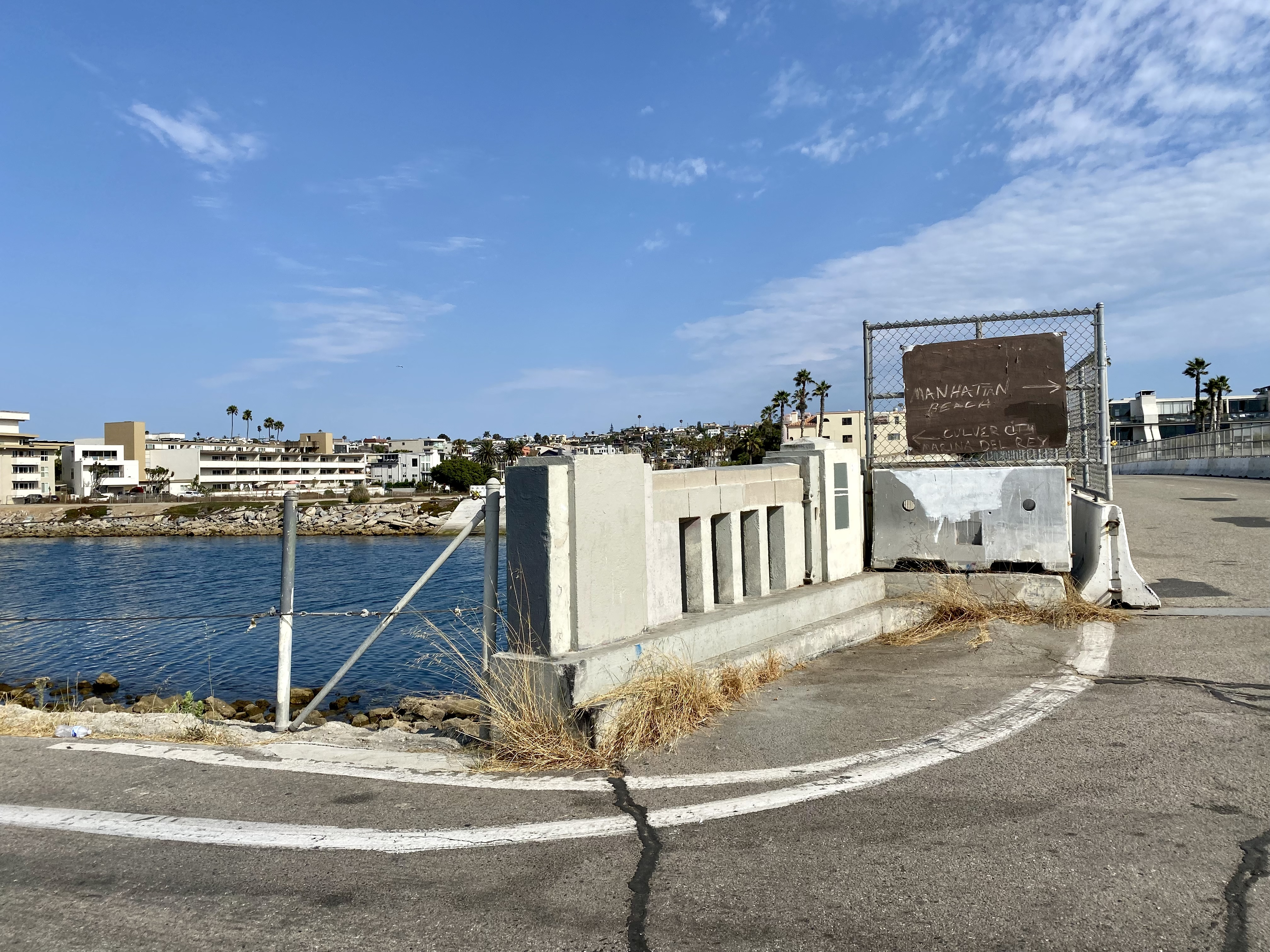
Handwritten wayfinding signage is a type of tactical urbanism

The tactical urbanism movement takes inspiration from urban experiments including Ciclovía, Paris-Plages, and the introduction of plazas and pedestrian malls in New York City during the tenure of Janette Sadik-Khan as Commissioner of the New York City Department of Transportation.

Tactical urbanism formally emerged as a movement following a meeting of the Next Generation of New Urbanist (CNU NextGen) group in November 2010 in New Orleans. A driving force of the movement is to put the onus back on individuals to take personal responsibility in creating sustainable buildings, streets, neighborhoods, and cities. Following the meeting, an open-source project called Tactical Urbanism: Short TermAction | Long Term Change was developed by a group from NextGen to define tactical urbanism and to promote various interventions to improve urban design and promote positive change in neighbourhoods and communities.

== Examples ==
Honolulu, Hawaii has some of the highest pedestrian fatality rates in the United States (Wong 2012). Many of their busiest intersections reflect city standards from years past without modification as the quantity of vehicular traffic and associated speeds have changed dramatically. Some residents chose to take a stand in 2014. Within the crosswalk of one of these busy intersections, residents altered the crosswalk lines so that they spelled out "Aloha," the traditional Hawaiian salutation. While the perpetrators sought to introduce a level of humanity to the dangerous location, city officials stated that the change was a "deviation from the standard."

In spring of 2016, the city of Chicago posted unique "no right turn" signage to an intersection. To call attention to this new condition, an unknown person installed two small planter boxes within the crosswalk with flowering plants. Many responded positively while local businesses expressed concern for the traffic pattern change and its effect on their business.

== Types of interventions ==
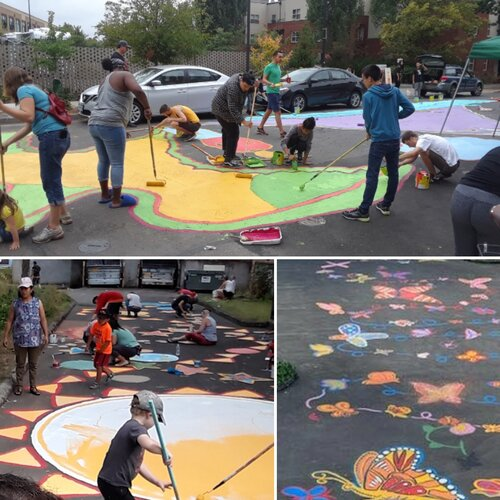
Street painting by Ζωγραφιά City RePAIR Project

Tactical urbanism projects vary significantly in scope, size, budget, legality, and support. Projects often begin as grassroots interventions and spread to other cities, and are in some cases later adopted by municipal governments as best practices. Some common interventions are listed below:

=== Improving public spaces ===
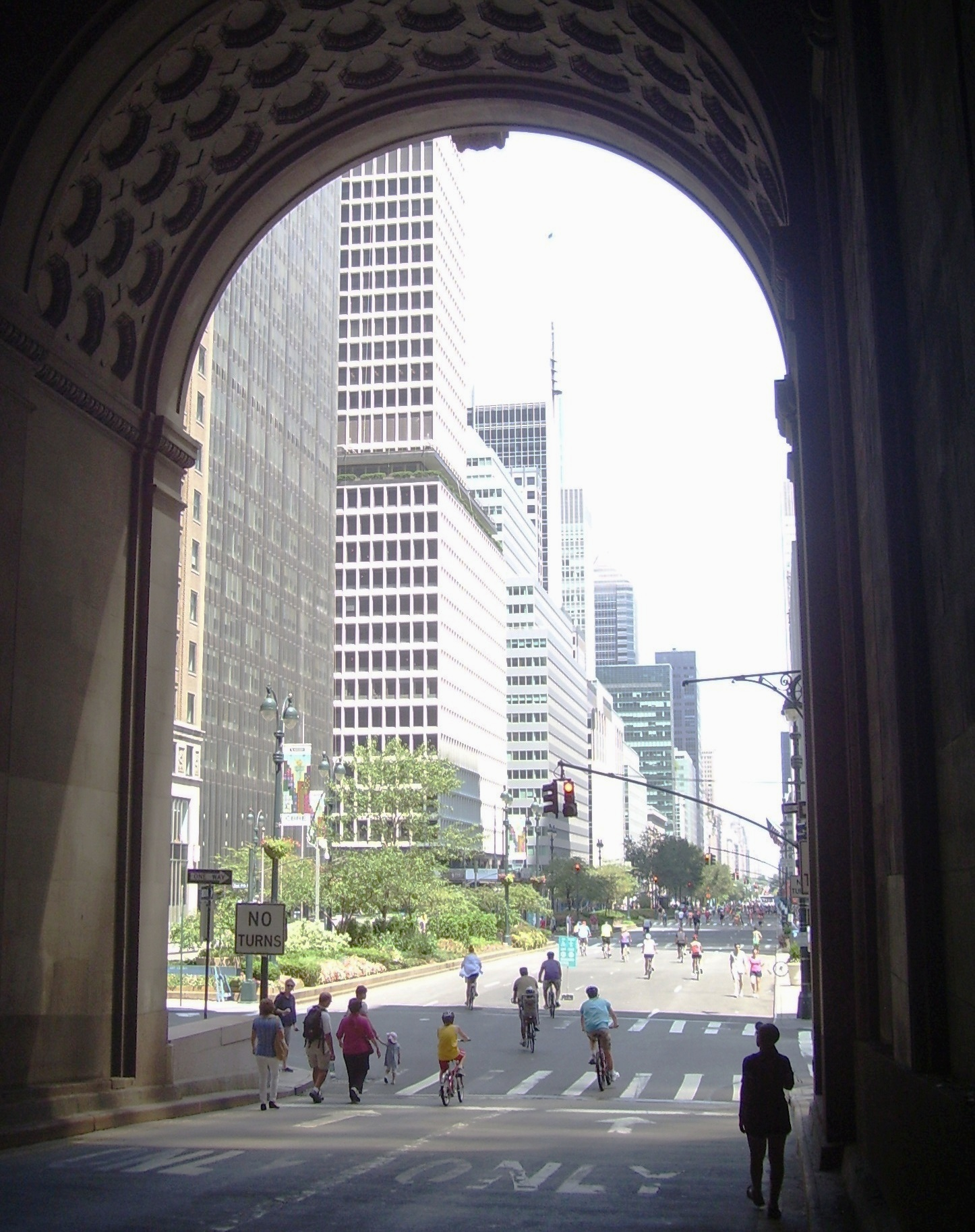
Summer Streets in New York City, Park Avenue Viaduct

Better block initiatives
Temporarily transforming retail streets using cheap or donated materials and volunteers. Spaces are transformed by introducing food carts, sidewalk tables, temporary bike lanes and narrowing of streets.
Chair bombing
The act of removing salvageable materials and using it to build public seating. The chairs are placed in areas that either are quiet or lack comfortable places to sit.
Food carts/trucks
Food carts and trucks are used to attract people to underused public spaces and offer small business opportunities for entrepreneurs.

Open streets
To temporarily provide safe spaces for walking, bicycling, skating, and social activities; promote local economic development; and raise awareness about the impact of cars in urban spaces. "Open Streets" is an anglicized term for the South American 'Ciclovia', which originated in Bogotá
Park(ing) Day
An annual event where on street parking is converted into park-like spaces. Park(ing) Day was launched in 2005 by Rebar art and design studio.
Pavement To Plazas
Popularized in New York City, Pavement to Plazas involve converting space on streets to usable public space. The closure of Times Square to vehicular traffic, and its low-cost conversion to a pedestrian plaza, is a primary example of a pavement plaza.
Pop-up cafes
Temporary patios or terraces built in parking spots to provide overflow seating for a nearby cafe or for passersby. Most common in cities where sidewalks are narrow and where there otherwise is not room for outdoor sitting or eating areas.
Pop-up parks
Temporary or permanent transformations of underused spaces into community gathering areas through beautification.
Pop-up retail
Temporary retail stores that are set up in vacant stores or property.

=== Infrastructure ===
Crosswalk painting
Guerrilla crosswalks are zebra crossings painted by the community on roadways and at intersections where the city government has failed to provide a marked pedestrian crossing.
Practical walkways
Desire paths are footpaths or other paths that form via natural use rather than paths designed for use by humans in urban environments. Some of these paths are later improved or paved to offer a more practical route to a particular destination.
Protected bike lanes
Pop-up bicycle lanes are usually done by placing potted plants or other physical barriers to make painted bike lanes feel safer. Sometimes there is no pre-existing bike lane, and the physical protection is the only delineator.
Improved signs
for some Canadian bus stops, California Interstate110 freeway exit lane.

=== Removal ===
De-fencing
The act of removing unnecessary fences to break down barriers between neighbours, beautify communities, and encourage community building.
Depaving
The act of removing unnecessary pavement to transform driveways and parking into green space so that rainwater can be absorbed and neighbourhoods beautified.
Sabotaging hostile architecture
The act of obstructing, defacing, or removing hostile architecture, usually anti-homeless spikes or armrests, to undermine their intended effects, often to protest anti-homelessness legislation. These actions in particular are often considered acts of vandalism.

=== Nature ===
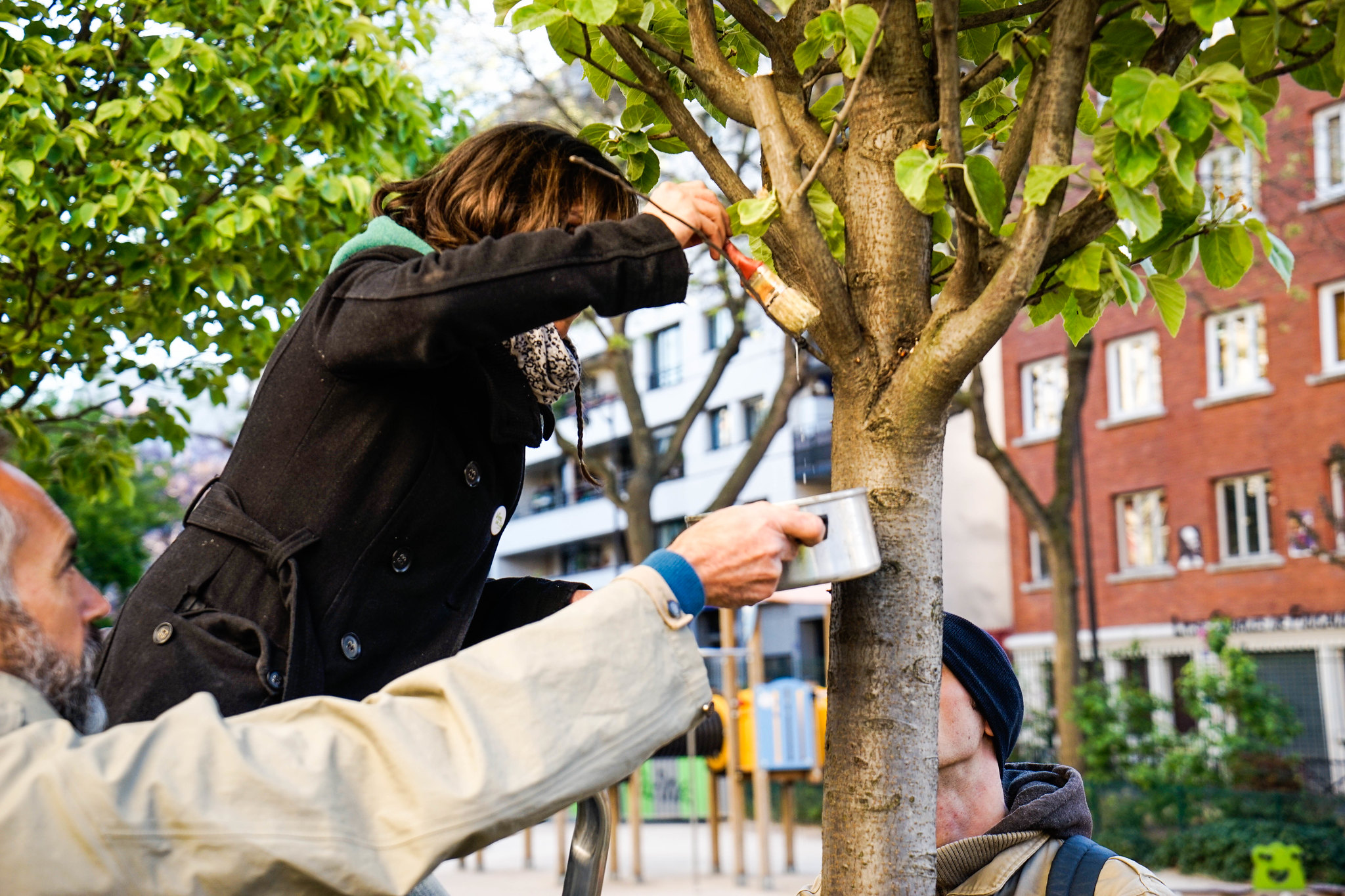
Guerilla Grafting

Guerrilla gardening
Cultivating land that the gardeners do not have the legal rights to utilize, such as abandoned sites, areas not being cared for, or private property.
Guerrilla grafting
Grafting fruitbearing branches onto sterile street trees to make an edible city.

== See also ==
- Reclaim the Streets
- Road diet
- Sneckdown
- Street reclamation
- Urbanism
- Urban interventionism
