= Sneckdown =

Curb extension caused by snowfall

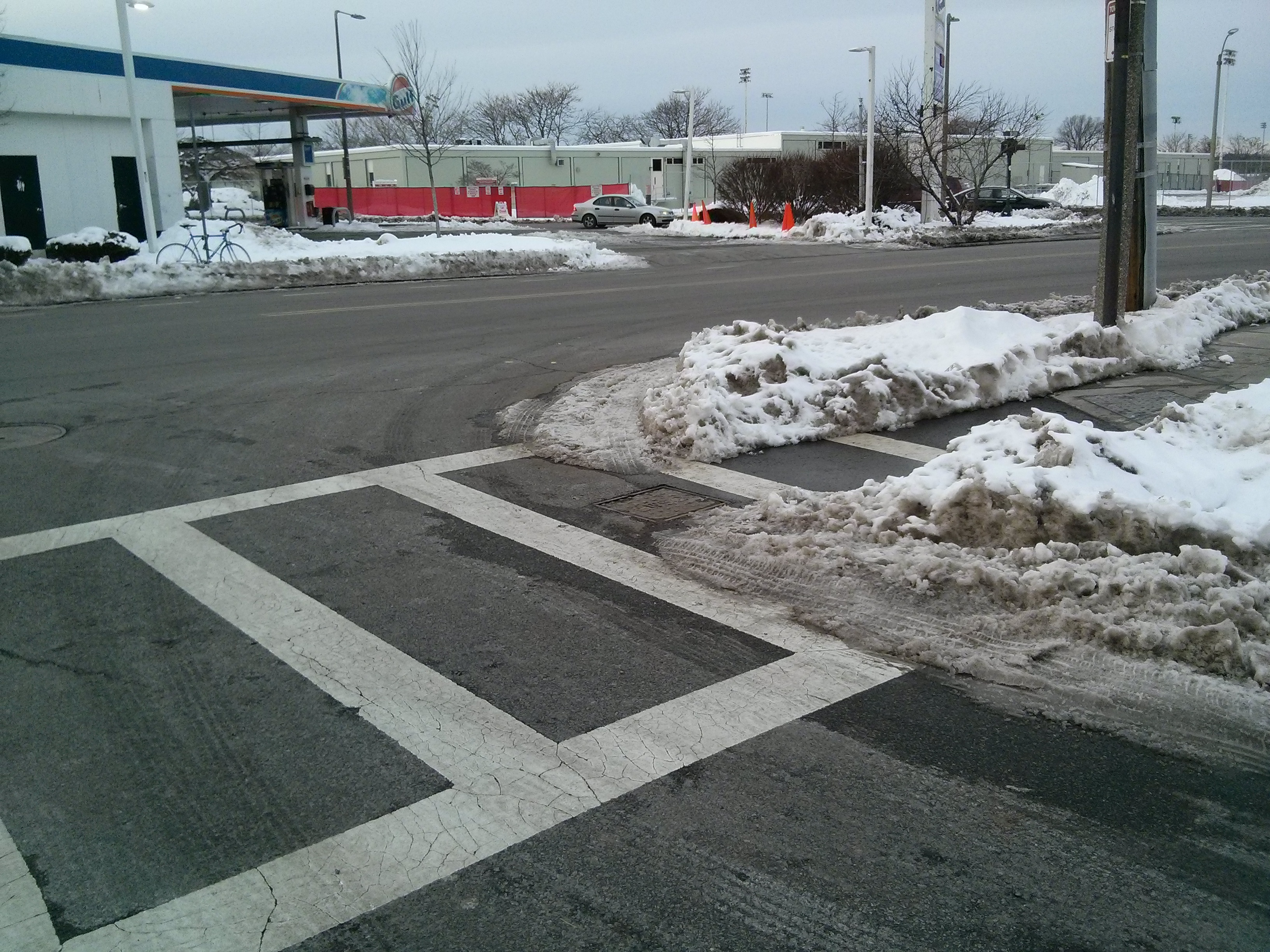
A sneckdown on a corner in Allston, Massachusetts, United States

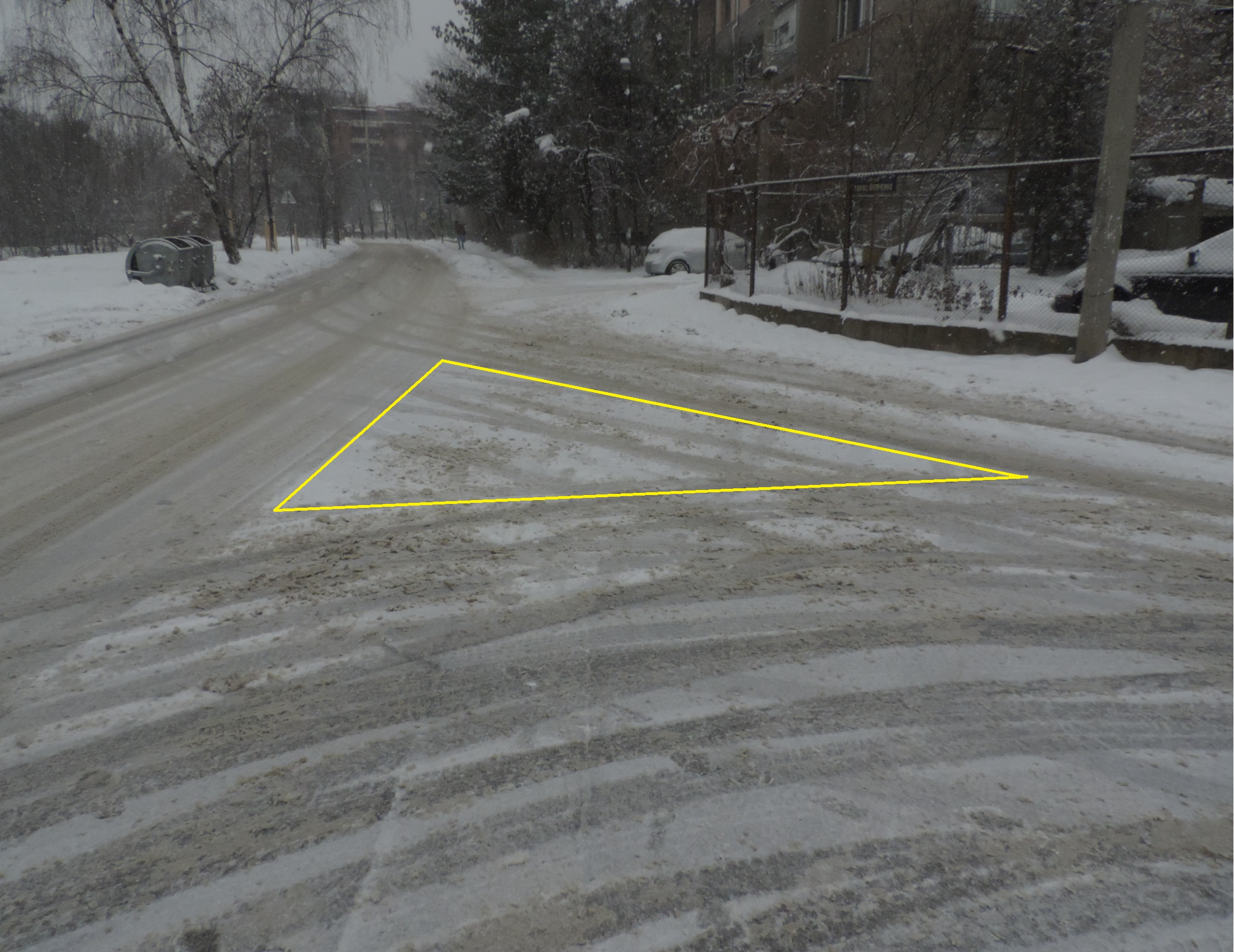
Sneckdown showing a triangle of less used road space on a T-intersection in Sofia, Bulgaria

A sneckdown (or snowy neckdown) is a buildup of snow on a road that has not been flattened and cleared by traffic, particularly at an intersection. Because it marks where traffic does not go, a sneckdown may reveal where traffic calming measures such as curb extensions or narrower lanes might be safely implemented.

== History ==
The term "sneckdown" was coined by Streetsblog founder Aaron Naparstek in 2014, popularized by Streetfilms director Clarence Eckerson, Jr. and spread widely via social media. Other Twitter hashtags that have been used to describe snow-based traffic-calming measures include #plowza, #slushdown, #snovered and #snowspace.

The practice of using snow to trace the behavior of vehicles, pedestrians, and playing children was already described in Camillo Sitte's 1889 urban design treatise The Art of Building Cities.

In the 1980s, some planners in Australia distributed cake flour in intersections to observe patterns of vehicle movement hours later.

In Philadelphia, Pennsylvania, United States at Baltimore and 48th Street, a sneckdown-inspired permanent upgrade to the pedestrian environment was made in 2011.

== See also ==
- Desire path
- Tactical urbanism
