= Goat Path =

Goat Path may refer to:

- Pennsylvania Route 23
- Desire path
