= Atkins Park (Columbia, Missouri) =

Park in Columbia, Missouri

Thomas E. Atkins Jr. Memorial Park
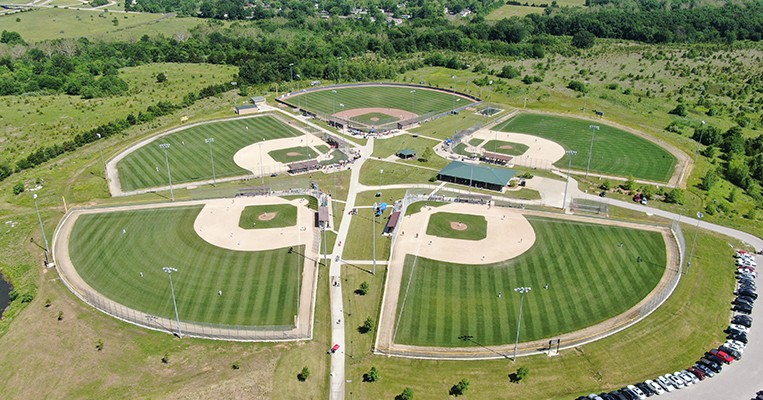
- Interactive map of Thomas E. Atkins Jr. Memorial Park
- Type: Public
- Location: Columbia, Missouri
- Coordinates: 39°0′40″N 92°17′42″W
- Area: 81.4 acres (329,000 m^{2})
- Opened: May 11, 2009
- Owner: City of Columbia and Boone County
- Operator: Columbia Parks and Recreation
- Open: 6:00 Am to Midnight
- Website: https://www.como.gov/parks/atkins-park

Thomas E. Atkins Jr. Memorial Park is a public park in Columbia, Missouri, containing five baseball fields.

== History ==
Atkins Park was donated to the City of Columbia and County of Boone in 2002 by Thomas Atkins III. The Park was Dedicated on May 11, 2009.

== Geography ==
Atkins Park is located at 5220 N Gravel Road, and Adjacent to the Boone County Fairgrounds

== Construction projects ==
Capital improvement projects and Council items
Year Completed	Project Description
2007	Park Operation and Management Agreement with Boone County
2008	Annual Roads and Parking: Pave Entry Road and Parking Lot
2009	Black and Gold Fields, Parking Lot, Drive, Shelter
2010	Annual Roads and Parking: Repair Entry Road
2011	Annual Roads and Parking: Repair, Overlay, and Wedge Entry Road
2012	Third Baseball Field, Concession/Restroom
2017	Complete Five Field Baseball Complex
2017	Black Field Improvements
2017	Annual Roads and Parking: Asphalt and Curbing for an Additional Parking Lot

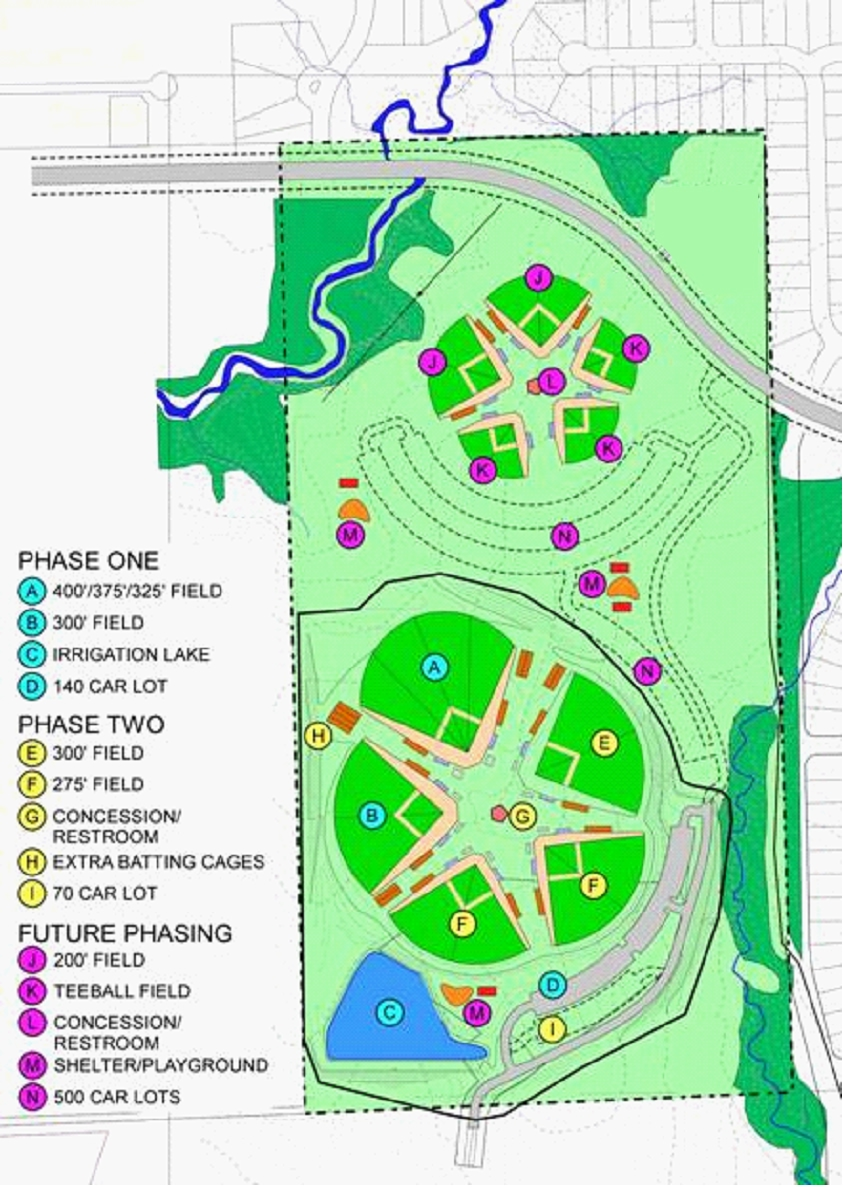
A Map of Atkins Park and the Future Plans for the Park

The table shows the previous and already completed projects so far in Atkins Park, but the City of Columbia plans to construct five more baseball fields from the already existing five fields in a multi-year project to construct 10 fields in Atkins Park.
