= Natural lines of drift =

Paths across terrain

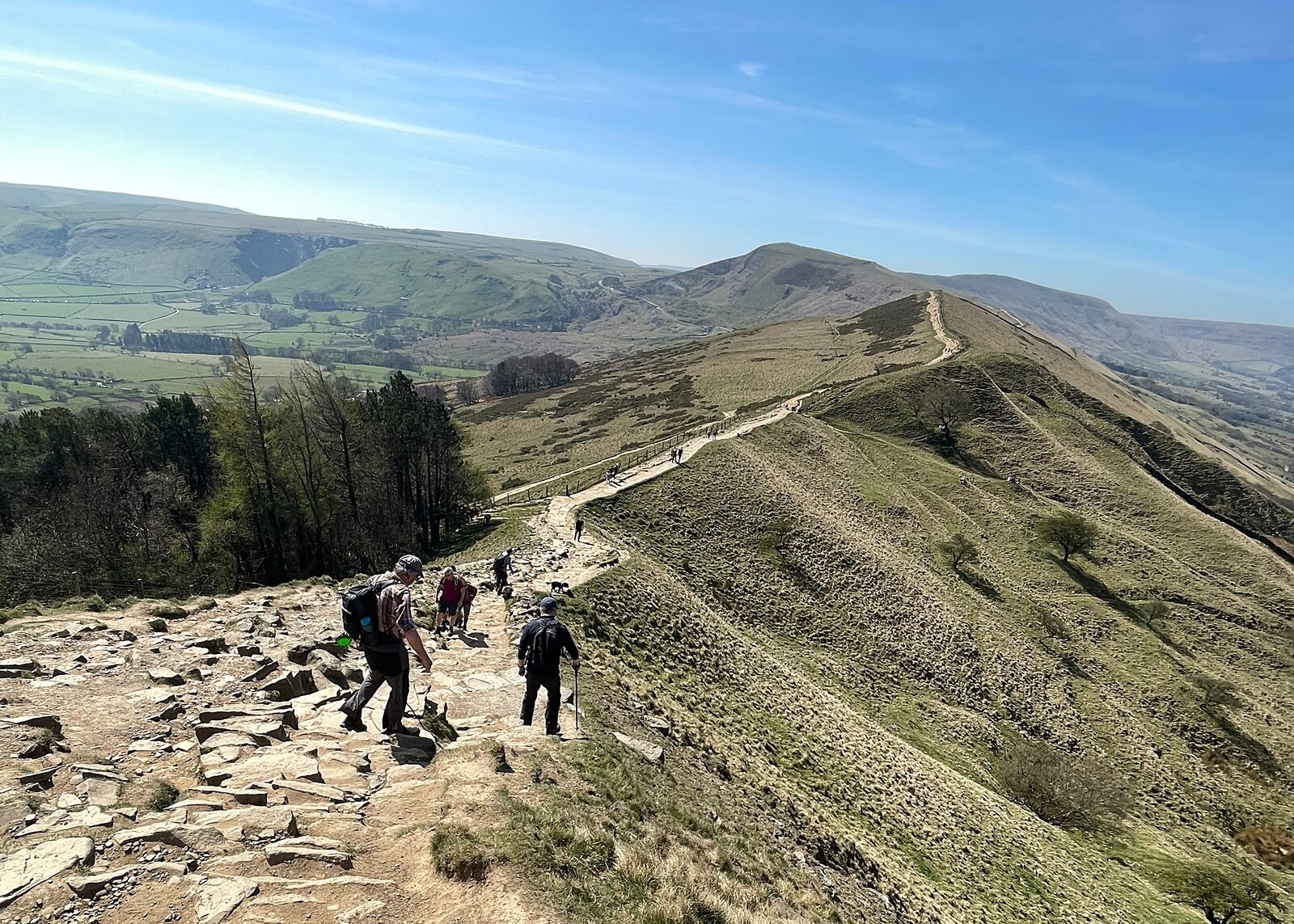
Hikers walking along a ridge

Natural lines of drift are those paths across terrain that are the most likely to be used when going from one place to another. These paths are paths of least resistance: those that offer the greatest ease while taking into account obstacles (e.g. rivers, cliffs, dense unbroken woodland, etc.) and modes of transit (e.g. pedestrian, automobile, horses.). Common endpoints or fixed points may include water sources, food sources, and obstacle passages such as fords or bridges.

Local paths may be derived from game trails or from artificial paths created by utility lines or political boundaries. Property ownership and land use may also be factors in determining local variation.

Improved paths may also be partially defined by the logistics necessary to build roads or railways.

== See also ==
- Desire path
- Footpath
- Trail

== Sources ==
- Realistic Human Path Planning using Fluid Simulation
