= Kevin A. Lynch =

American urban planner and author (1918–1984)

Kevin Lynch
- Born: Kevin Andrew Lynch; January 7, 1918; Chicago, Illinois, United States
- Died: April 25, 1984 (aged 66); Aquinnah, Martha's Vineyard, Massachusetts, United States
- Occupations: Urban planner, scholar, writer
- Awards: Rexford G. Tugwell Award (1984)

Academic background
- Education: Massachusetts Institute of Technology
- Influences: Frank Lloyd Wright

Academic work
- Institutions: Massachusetts Institute of Technology (1949–1978)
- Main interests: Urban planning; environmental psychology; urban form
- Notable works: The Image of the City; What Time is This Place? A Theory of Good Urban Form
- Notable ideas: Mental mapping; wayfinding; imageability

Kevin Andrew Lynch (January 7, 1918 – April 25, 1984) was an American urban planner and author. He is known for his work on the perceptual form of urban environments and was an early proponent of mental mapping. His most influential books include The Image of the City (1960), a seminal work on the perceptual form of urban environments, and What Time is This Place? (1972), which theorizes how the physical environment captures and refigures temporal processes.

A student of architect Frank Lloyd Wright before training in city planning, Lynch spent his academic career at the Massachusetts Institute of Technology, teaching there from 1948 to 1978. He practiced site planning and urban design professionally with Carr/Lynch Associates, later known as Carr, Lynch, and Sandell.

== Biography ==
=== Early life and education ===
Lynch was born as the youngest child of an Irish-American family on January 7, 1918. He was raised on Chicago's North Side. After graduating from the Francis Parker School in 1935, Lynch matriculated at Yale University intending to study architecture. Finding its pedagogy too conservative, he left to study under Frank Lloyd Wright at Taliesin in Spring Green, Wisconsin and Scottsdale Arizona. Lynch later stated that Wright was a great influence, but disagreed with his individualistic social philosophy. Leaving Wright after a year and a half, he enrolled at Rensselaer Polytechnic Institute in Troy, New York to study engineering in 1939, but did not complete the program and went to work for Chicago architect Paul Schweikher. In 1941, Lynch married Anne Borders, a fellow graduate of the Parker School.

Three weeks after his wedding, Lynch was drafted into the Army Corps of Engineers, serving in the siege of Peleliu, the Philippines and Japan through January 1946. After the war, he completed his undergraduate education at MIT and received a bachelor's degree in city planning in 1947.

=== Academic career ===
After graduation, Lynch began work in Greensboro, North Carolina as an urban planner but was soon recruited to teach at MIT by Lloyd Rodwin. He began lecturing at MIT the following year, becoming an assistant professor in 1949, a tenured associate professor in 1955, and a full professor in 1963.

In 1954, after receiving a grant from the Ford Foundation to study urban form in Italy, Lynch and his MIT teaching colleague György Kepes were awarded a grant from the Rockefeller Foundation to study perceptions of the urban environment and urban form. (Note: The Rockefeller Foundation grant was the first in a series of awards made during the 1950s and early 1960s to researchers studying urban design. Other recipients included Jane Jacobs, Ian McHarg and Edmund Bacon.) In 1958 Lynch wrote an essay ‘The theory of urban form’ with Lloyd Rodwin where the city is described through the complementary of two systems – flows and adapted spaces – interpreted starting from a group of descriptive categories of urban form. Lynch and Kepes' research was published in 1960 as Lynch's book The Image of the City. In 1970, Lynch received funding from UNESCO to study the use of cities by young people in urban areas of Salta, Melbourne, Toluca, and Kraków, a project summarized in his book Growing Up in Cities (1977).

Lynch provided seminal contributions to the field of City Planning through empirical research on how individuals perceive and navigate the urban landscape. His books explore the presence of time and history in the urban environment, how urban environments affect children, and how to harness human perception of the physical form of cities and regions as the conceptual basis for good urban design.

Parallel to his academic work, Lynch practiced planning and urban design in partnership with Stephen Carr, with whom he founded Carr/Lynch Associates in Cambridge, Massachusetts.

=== Later life ===
Lynch became professor emeritus in 1978, but continued to write and practice architecture. He died of a heart attack at his summer home at Gay Head on Martha's Vineyard, on April 25, 1984.

== The Image of the City ==
Lynch's most famous work, The Image of the City (1960), is the result of a five-year study on how observers take in information of the city. Using three American cities as examples (Boston, Jersey City and Los Angeles), Lynch reported that users understood their surroundings in consistent and predictable ways, forming mental maps with five elements:

- paths, the streets, sidewalks, trails, and other channels in which people travel;
- edges, perceived boundaries such as walls, buildings, and shorelines;
- districts, relatively large sections of the city distinguished by some identity or character;
- nodes, focal points, intersections or loci;
- landmarks, readily identifiable objects which serve as external reference points.

In the same book, Lynch also coined the words "imageability" and "wayfinding". Image of the City has had important and durable influence in the fields of urban planning and environmental psychology.

== Personal life ==
Anne Borders Lynch and Kevin Lynch were married in 1941 and had four children. The Lynches were long-term residents of Martha's Vineyard, where Anne continued spending her summers until her death, in 2011.

== See also ==
- Kevin Lynch Award

== Bibliography ==
=== Books ===
- Lynch, Kevin (1960). The Image of the City. Cambridge MA: MIT Press. OL 5795447M.
- Lynch, Kevin; Hack, Gary (1962). Site Planning. MIT Press. (2nd ed. 1971; 3rd ed. 1984)
- Appleyard, Donald; Lynch, Kevin; Myer, John R (1964). The View from the Road. MIT Press.
- Lynch, Kevin (1972). What Time is this Place?. MIT Press. ISBN 0-262-12061-5.
- ——— (1976). Managing the Sense of a Region. MIT Press. ISBN 0-262-12072-0. (2nd ed. 1980)
- ——— (1981). A Theory of Good City Form. MIT Press. ISBN 0-262-12085-2. (2nd ed. Good City Form 1984)
- ——— (1990). Southworth, Michael (ed.). Wasting Away. San Francisco: Sierra Club Books. ISBN 0-87156-675-3.

=== Selected articles ===
- ——— (April 1954). "The Form of Cities". Scientific American. 190 (4): 54–63. Bibcode:1954SciAm.190d..54L. doi:10.1038/scientificamerican0454-54.
- ——— (1961). "The Pattern of the Metropolis". Daedalus. 90 (1): 79–98.
- ——— (January 1961). "How We See Our Cities". MIT Technology Review. 63: 19–21.
- ——— (September 1965). "The City as Environment". Scientific American. 213 (3): 209–219. Bibcode:1965SciAm.213c.209L. doi:10.1038/scientificamerican0965-209.
- ——— (1984). "The Immature Arts of City Design". Places. 1 (3): 10–21.

=== Book chapters ===
- ——— (1976). "Grounds for Utopia" (PDF). EDRA 6: Responding to Social Change. The Environmental Design Research Association. pp. 27–46.
- ——— (1984). "Reconsidering the Image of the City". In Banerjee, Tridib; Southworth, Michael (eds.). Cities of the Mind: Environment, Development, and Public Policy. Springer. pp. 151–161.

=== Edited volumes ===
- ———, ed. (1977). Growing Up in Cities. MIT Press. ISBN 026212078X.

=== Anthologies ===
- ——— (1990). Banerjee, Tridib; Southworth, Michael (eds.). City Sense and City Design: Writings and Projects of Kevin Lynch. MIT Press. ISBN 0-262-12143-3.
