= Path of least resistance =

Concept in physics and mathematics

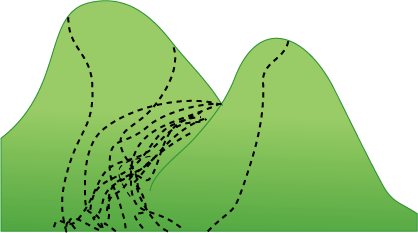
Hikers choose the easy way to cross hills

In physics and mathematics, the path of least resistance is the pathway that provides the least resistance to forward motion by a given object or entity, among a set of alternative paths. The concept is often used to describe why an object or entity takes a given path.

== Physics ==
In physics, the "path of least resistance" is a heuristic from folk physics that can sometimes, in very simple situations, describe approximately what happens. It is an approximation of the tendency to the least energy state. Other examples are "what goes up must come down" (gravity) and "heat goes from hot to cold" (second law of thermodynamics). But these simple descriptions are not derived from laws of physics and in more complicated cases these heuristics will fail to give even approximately correct results.

The path of least resistance applies on a local, not global, reference. For example, water always flows downhill, regardless of whether briefly flowing uphill will help it gain a lower final altitude (with certain exceptions such as superfluids and siphons). In physics, this phenomenon allows the formation of potential wells, where potential energy is stored because of a barrier restricting flow to a lower energy state.

== Electronics ==
In electrical circuits, for example, the current always follows all available paths, and in some simple cases the "path of least resistance" will take up most of the current, but this will not be generally true in even slightly more complicated circuits. It may seem for example, that if there are three paths of approximately equal resistance, the majority of the current will flow down one of the three paths. However, due to electrons repelling each other, the total path of least resistance is in fact to have approximate equal current flowing through each path. The reason for this is that three paths made of equally conductive wire will have a total resistance that is one-third of the single path. In conclusion, the current is always distributed over all possible paths inversely proportional to their resistance.

== Human behavior ==
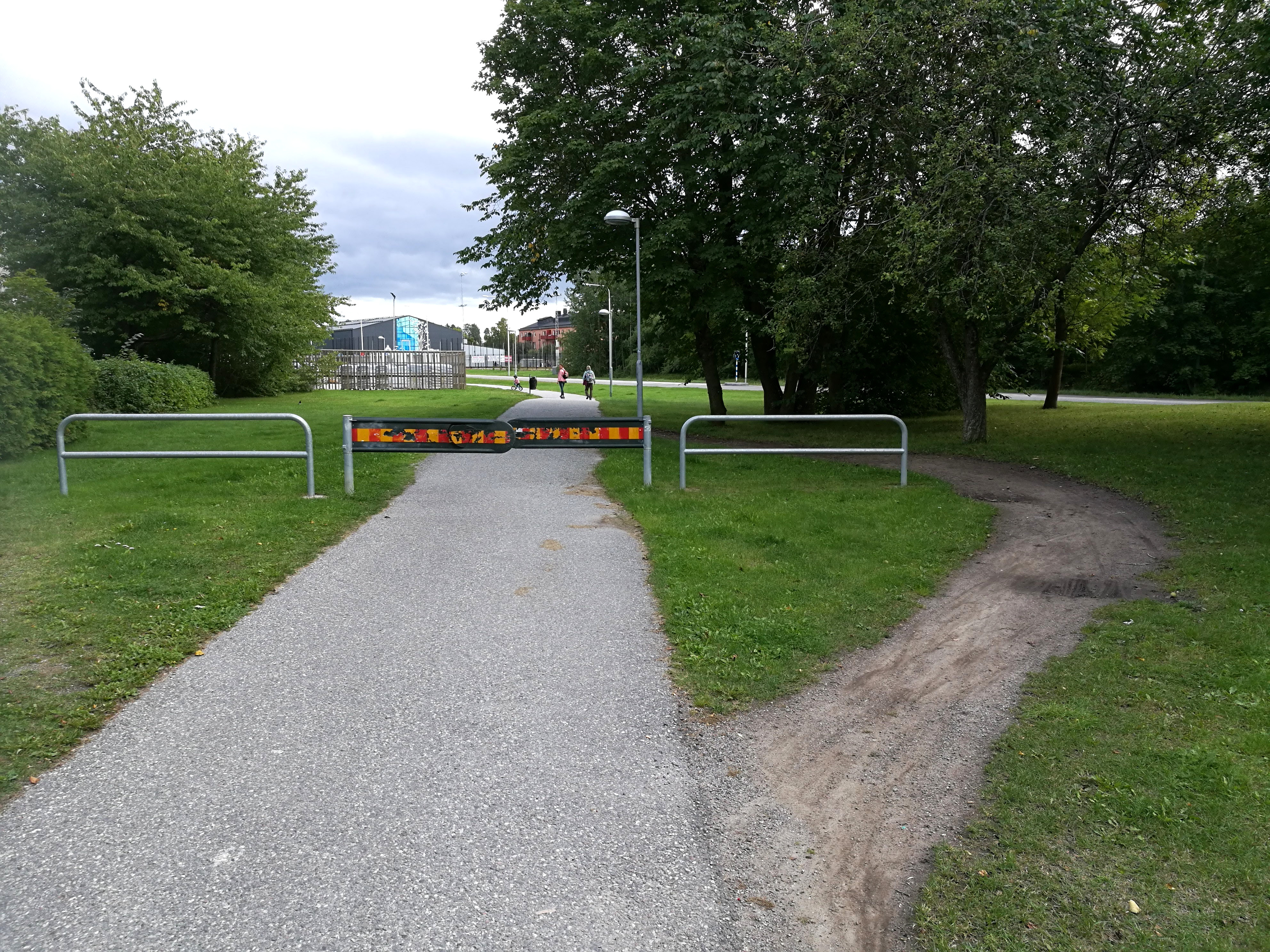
Bicycle traffic barrier used to slow down cyclists circumvented by a detour in the form of a desire path, thereby showing a literal path of least resistance

The path of least resistance is also used to describe certain human behaviors, although with much less specificity than in the strictly physical sense. In these cases, resistance is often used as a metaphor for personal effort or confrontation; a person taking the path of least resistance avoids these. In library science and technical writing, information is ideally arranged for users according to the principle of least effort, or the "path of least resistance". Recursive navigation systems are an example of this.

== See also ==
- Calculus of variations
- Mountain pass theorem
- Principle of least action
- Variational principle
- Gradient descent
- Natural lines of drift
- Desire path
- Cognitive miser
