= Intersection daylighting =

Enhancing visibility at intersections to improve safety

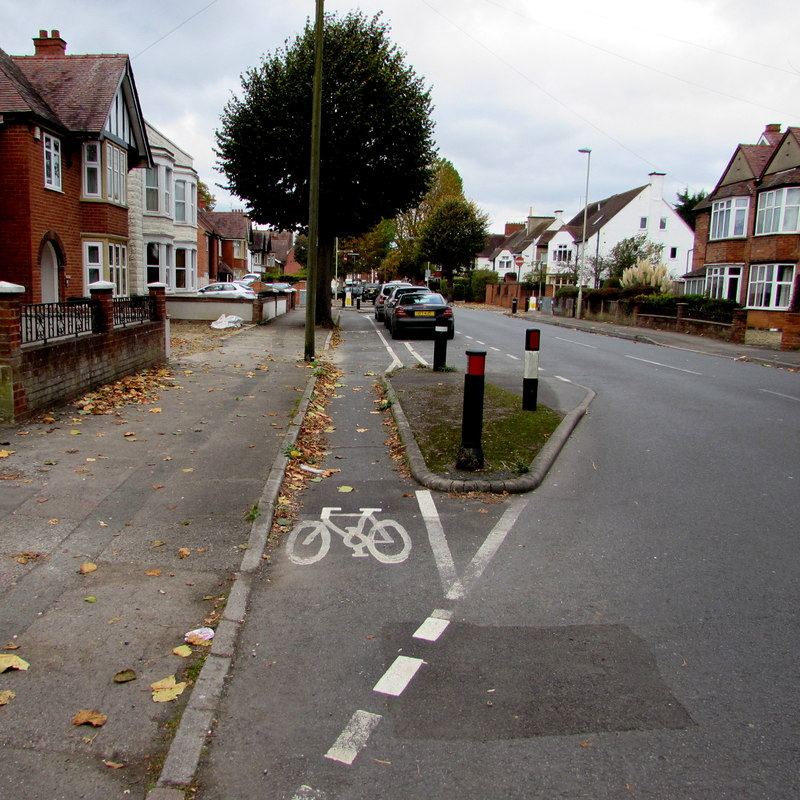
Refuge islands can be used to prevent parking near intersection

Intersection daylighting, or simply daylighting, is an urban design strategy to enhance safety at intersections by improving visibility. Daylighting reduces collisions by removing obstructions at intersections—including parked cars—that prevent drivers from seeing other cars, pedestrians, bicyclists, and other road users.

About 40-60% of pedestrian and cyclist injuries occur at intersections.

The National Association of City Transportation Officials (NACTO) recommends daylighting by preventing cars from parking within 20–25 feet (6.1–7.6 m) of an intersection. Some jurisdictions, such as New York state (excluding New York City), Pennsylvania, and California disallow parking 20–32 feet (6.1–9.8 m) near all intersections.

If parking is merely disallowed by law or signage, drivers may not always comply, so it is best to replace parking with curb extensions or other physical infrastructure that do not impede visibility. These can include, (Note: Some of these infrastructures can be paired together. For example, daylighting an intersection with a plaza will oftentimes also have bollards to protect pedestrians from potential car crashes.) but are not limited to:

- Physical impediments, including bollards, jersey barriers, traffic barriers, or granite blocks
- Permeable and absorbent infrastructure, including planters, bioswales, or parkways
- Public transport connections points, including bike share stations, bus shelters, or tram shelters
- Social spaces, including benches, plazas, or café seating.

== See also ==
- Traffic calming
- Curb extension
- Complete streets
- Vision Zero
- Transportation planning
- Urban design
