= The Image of the City =

1960 book by Kevin Lynch

- First edition
- Author: Kevin Lynch
- Language: English
- Subject: Urban Planning, Architecture
- Publisher: The MIT Press
- Publication date: 1960
- Pages: 194 pp.
- ISBN: 0-262-62001-4

The Image of the City is a 1960 book by American urban theorist Kevin Lynch. The book is the result of a five-year study of Boston, Jersey City and Los Angeles on how observers take in information about the city, and use it to make mental maps. Lynch's conclusion was that people form mental maps of their surroundings consisting of five basic elements. The book is Lynch's most well-known work, and some compare its importance in city planning to Camillo Sitte’s The Art of Building Cities.

== Imageability ==
Lynch argues that for any given city, a corresponding set of mental images exist in the minds of the people who experience that city. Contributing to those images are five qualities which Lynch identifies as Paths, Edges, Districts, Nodes, and Landmarks.

- Paths
  - These are the streets, sidewalks, trails, canals, railroads, and other channels in which people travel
  - They arrange space and movement between space
- Edges
  - Boundaries
  - They can be either Real or Perceived
  - These are walls, buildings, and shorelines, curbstone, streets, overpasses, etc.
- Districts
  - Medium to large areas that are two-dimensional
  - An individual enters into and out of these areas
  - Have common identifying characteristics
- Nodes
  - Large areas you can enter, serve as the foci of the city, neighborhood, district, etc.
  - Offers the person in them multiple perspectives of the other core elements
  - "...the most successful node seemed both to be unique in some way and at the same time to intensify some surrounding characteristic"
- Landmarks
  - Points of reference person cannot enter into
  - These are buildings, signs, stores, mountains, public art
  - At least one aspect of them is unique or memorable in the context they exist
  - Mobile Points (such as the sun) can be used as well

== Influence ==
The Image of the City has influenced the fields of environmental psychology and environmental behavior as well as a generation of researchers working within them. Researchers that include Amos Rapoport, Claire Cooper Marcus, Oscar Newman, William H. Whyte, Kenneth Craik and Donald Appleyard.

Marxist social theorist Fredric Jameson drew on Lynch's book for his theory of "cognitive mapping," first outlined in an essay of that name and later in his Postmodernism, or, the Cultural Logic of Late Capitalism.

== See also ==
- The Social Life of Small Urban Spaces
