= Desire path =

Improvised footpath created by frequent trampling

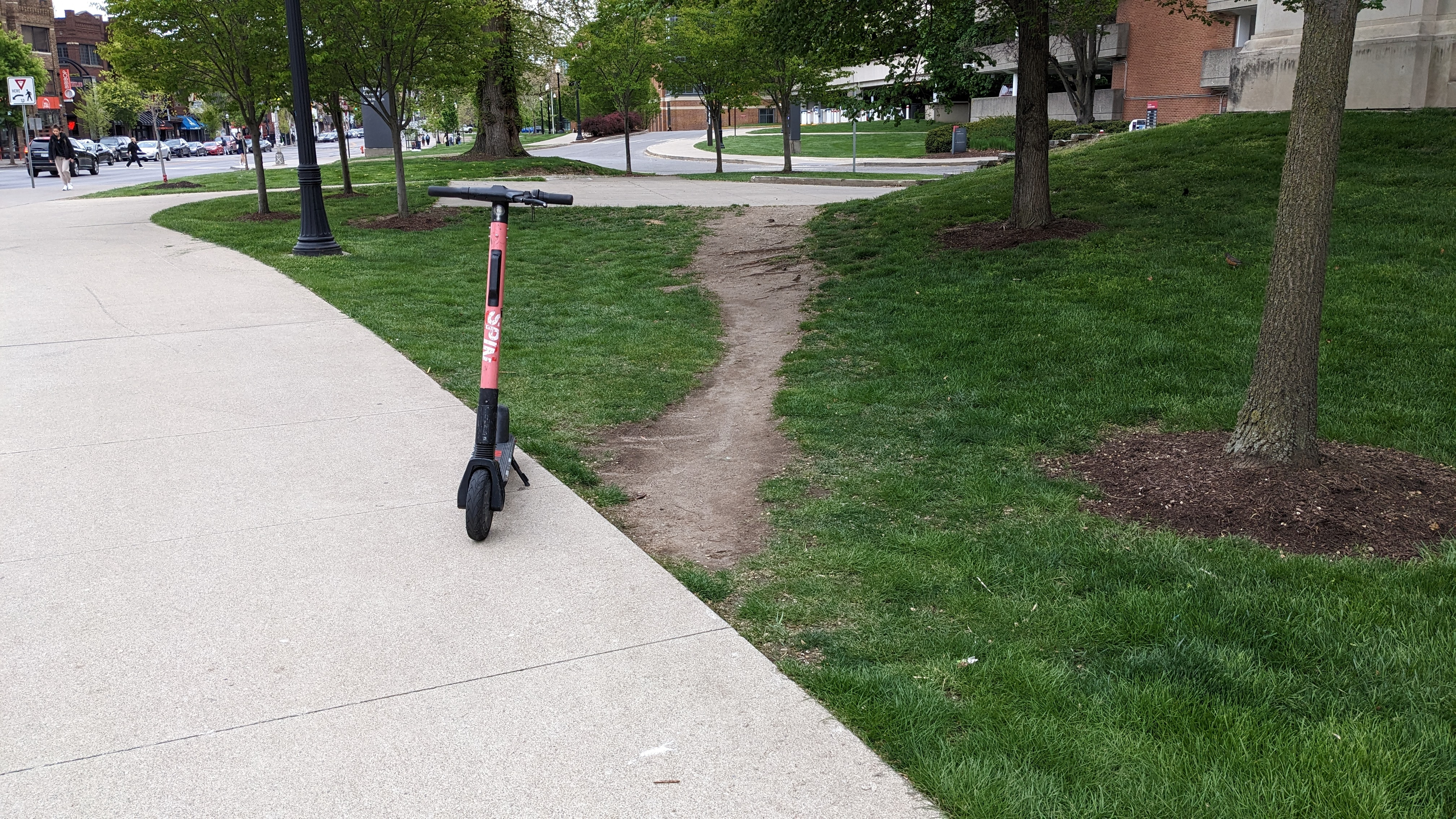
A desire path through a patch of grass between concrete sidewalks at The Ohio State University

A desire path (also known as desire line in transportation planning and by many other names (Note: including game trail, social trail, fishermen trail, destiny path, herd path, cow path, elephant path, buffalo trace, goat track, pig trail, use trail and bootleg trail)) is an unplanned small trail formed by erosion caused by human or animal traffic. The path usually represents the shortest or the most easily navigated route through a natural area or greenspace, and the width and severity of its surface erosion are often indicators of the quantity of traffic it receives.

Desire paths typically emerge as convenient shortcuts where more deliberately constructed roads and footpaths take a longer or more circuitous route, have gaps, or are non-existent. Once an improvised path has been trodden out through the natural vegetation, subsequent traffic tends to follow that visibly existing route (as it is more convenient than carving out a new path by oneself), and the repeated trampling will further erode away both the remaining groundcover and the soil quality that allows easy revegetation. Eventually, a clearly visible and easily traversable path emerges that humans and animals alike tend to prefer.

Desire paths may go on to become formal trails and even established thoroughfares, such as Broadway in New York City, which some urban planners believe to follow a convenient trail developed by the Wecquaesgeek people, predating American colonization.

== Parks and nature areas ==
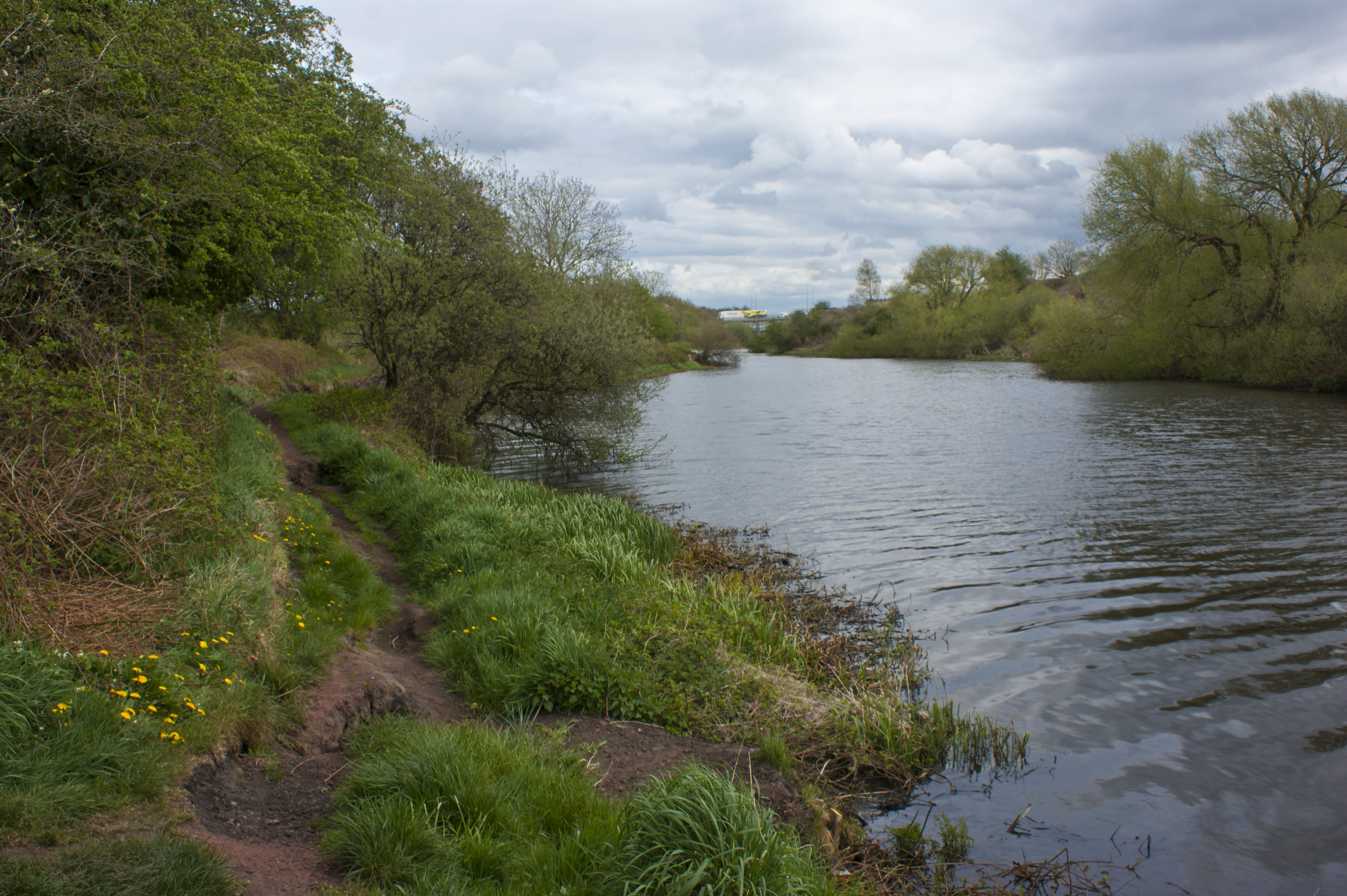
Bankside fishermen trails along the River Mersey

Desire paths sometimes cut through sensitive habitats and exclusion zones, threatening wildlife and park security. However, they also provide park management with an indicator of activity concentration. In Yosemite National Park, the National Park Service uses these indicators to help guide its management plan.

Trampling studies have consistently documented that impacts on soil and vegetation occur rapidly with initial use of desire paths. As few as 15 passages over a site can be enough to create a distinct trail, the existence of which then attracts further use. This finding contributed to the creation of the Leave No Trace education program, which instructs travelers in nature areas to either stay on designated trails or, when off trail, distribute their travel lines so as to not inadvertently create new trails in unsustainable locations.

The increase of desire paths leads to habitat fragmentation, which increases exterior habitat and decreases interior habitat. This causes a respective increase and decrease in species, with more sensitive interior species being affect the most, ultimately lowering biodiversity. Edges of the forest alongside the paths have higher temperatures and nutrient and pollutant amounts than the interior. These conditions kill fungi beneficial to the wildlife, with harmful pathogens replacing them. These edges also increase the opportunities for invasive species to be introduced to environments. This change is called the edge effect, and it is most prominent 50m from the edge of the forest.

Land managers have devised a variety of techniques to block the creation of desire paths, including fences, dense vegetation, and signage, though none are foolproof. Signage posted at the entrances to desire paths does not completely curb usage, with more people returning to the path over time. Between directly after the signage was posted and several months after, the usage increased four times. Modern trail design attempts to avoid the need for barriers and restrictions, by aligning trail layout and user desire through physical design and persuasive outreach.

COVID-19 increased the foot traffic to parks in Buffalo, New York, by 25% in 2020. These parks provided a safe place for recreation for people otherwise confined indoors. Due to the higher flow of people and the desire for separation, the number of desire paths increased. Webster Woods, a large protected area near Boston, experienced an increase in desire path length by 36% following COVID-19. This is a similar length to the amount created in the past 47 years.

== In cities ==
In the Lower Eastside of Detroit, Michigan, the shortest path between 131 random destinations using desire paths compared to not, is on average 20.58 feet (6.27 m) shorter. In 2010, the city housed over 150 miles (240 km) of desire line.

== Accommodation ==
Landscapers sometimes accommodate desire paths by paving them, thereby integrating them into the official path network rather than blocking them. Sometimes, land planners have deliberately left land fully or partially unpathed, waiting to see what desire paths are created, and then paving those. In Finland, planners are known to visit parks immediately after the first snowfall, when the existing paths are not visible. The naturally chosen desire paths, marked by footprints, can then be used to guide the routing of new purpose-built paths.

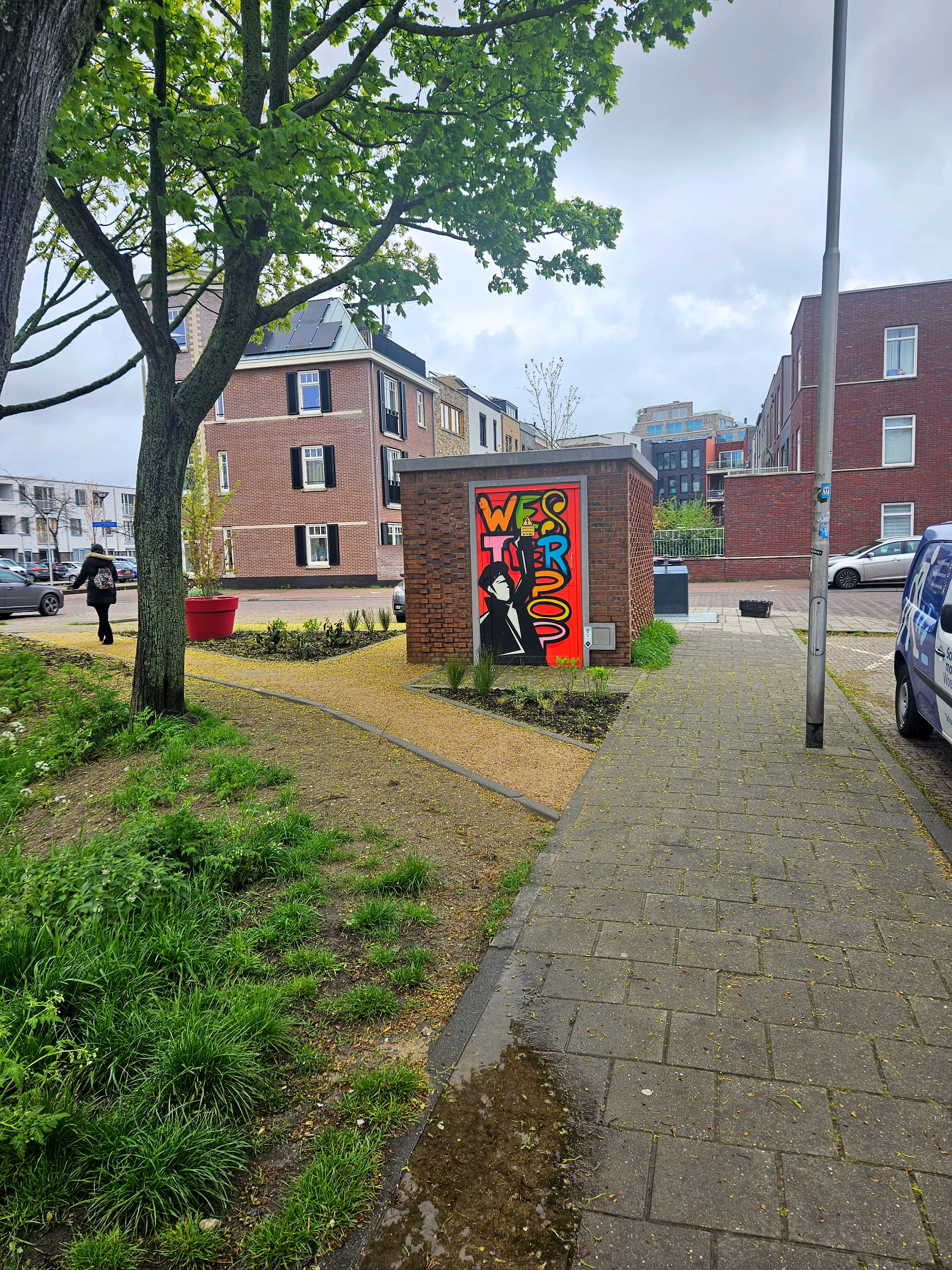
An accommodated desire path in Delft, Netherlands, having been reinforced with paving and incorporated into shrubbery

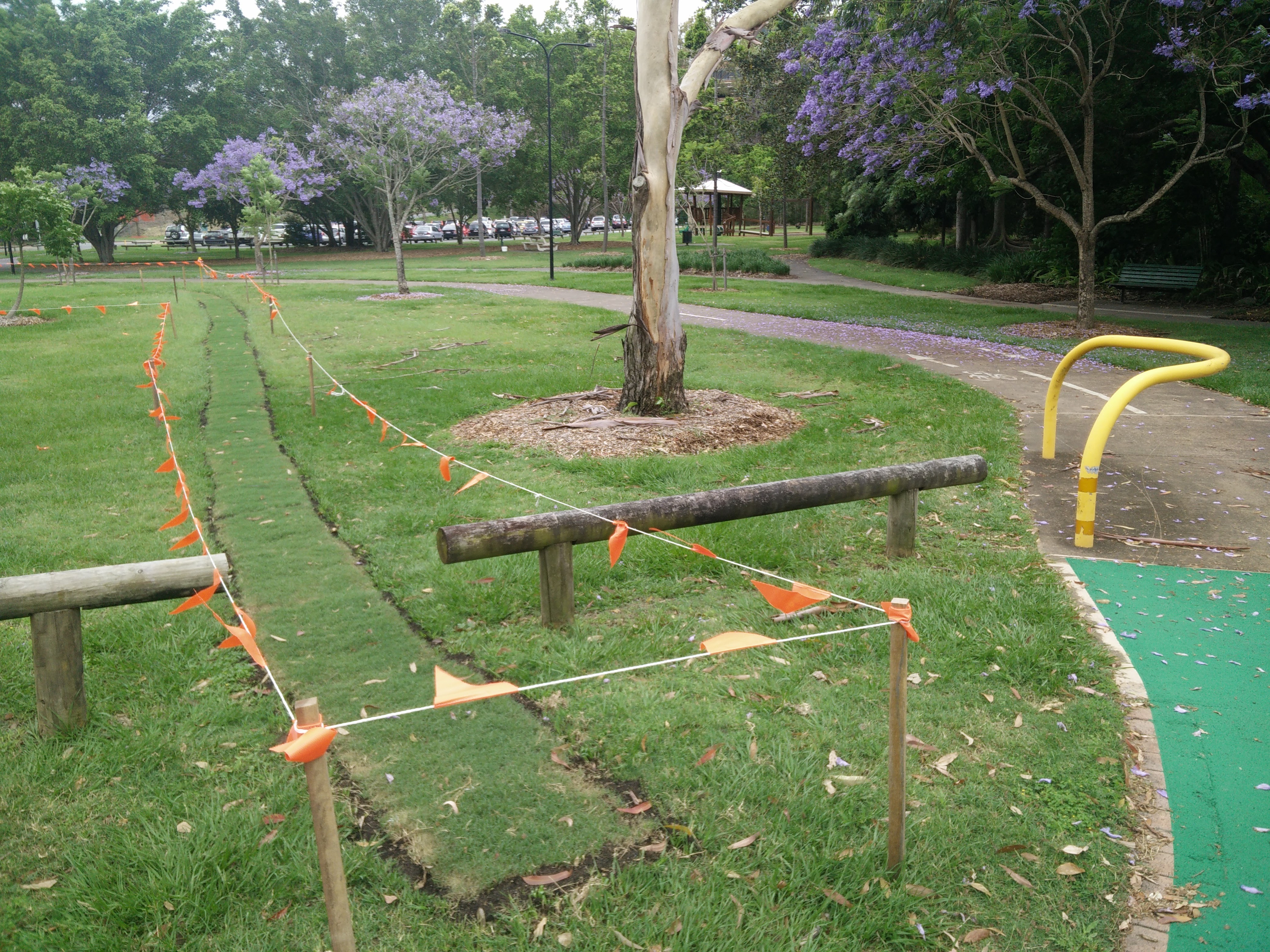
A desire path roped off for revegetation in Brisbane, Australia

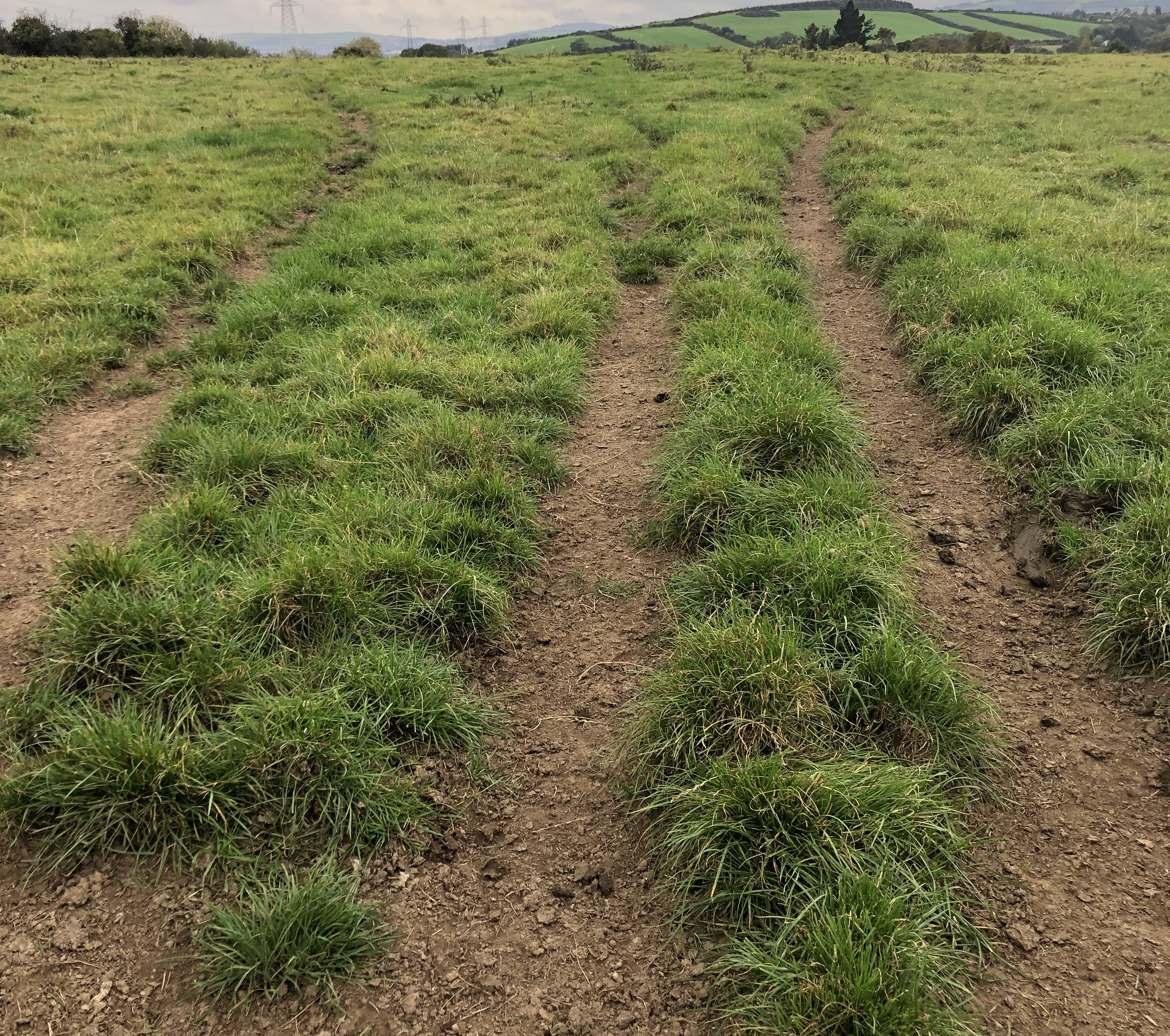
Three desire paths left by cattle leading to a water trough in Wicklow, Ireland

== Other uses of the concept ==
Images of desire paths have been employed as a metaphor for anarchism, intuitive design, individual creativity, and the wisdom of crowds.

In transportation planning and urban planning, desire lines are used to plan road networks and to analyze traffic patterns for a given mode of travel. For example, the 1959 Chicago Area Transportation Study used desire paths to illustrate commuter choices regarding railroad and subway trips.

In software design, the term is used to describe users' wide adoption of the same methods to overcome limitations in the software.

== See also ==
- Natural lines of drift
- Path of least resistance
- Sneckdown
- Wayfinding
