= Depaving =

Resurfacing paved areas

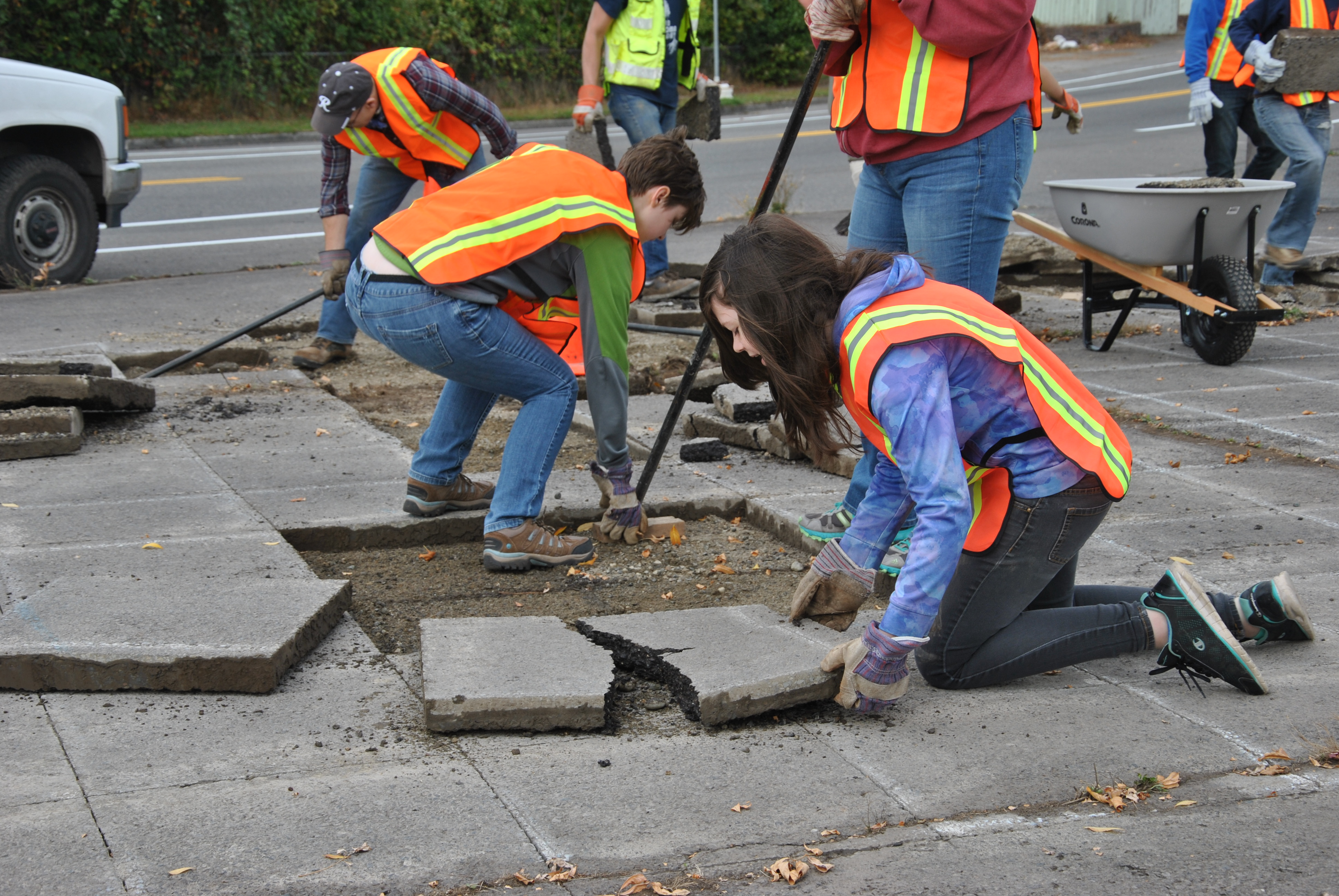
Depaving in Pierce County, Washington

Depaving, also known as desealing, is the act of removing impermeable surfaces such as parking lots and replacing with a permeable surface, especially green space. Depaving can help manage stormwater runoff, ensuring that runoff is less polluted.

The Depave Portland group in Portland, United States says that it has depaved more than 70 parking lots and removed 150,000 square feet (14,000 m^{2}) of paving since it was founded in 2008. Some cities, including Portland, charge impervious pavement fees to cover the cost of dealing with runoff, which incentivizes depaving. Eindhoven, Netherlands depaved parts of its area. The city of Leuven, Belgium is planning depaving as part of its Leuven2050 plan to become carbon-neutral and combat the urban heat island effect. Other motivations for depaving include providing habitat for wildlife, combating climate change or increasing quality of life by replacing underutilized paved areas with green space. A 2020 study found that depaving had high effectiveness for increasing groundwater replenishment.

According to a 2016 study by the Transportation Research Board of the National Academies, depaving is common on rural roads as a cost-saving measure due to the high cost of maintaining paved surfaces.
