= Mental mapping =

Person's point-of-view perception of their area

In behavioral geography, a mental map is a person's point-of-view perception of their area of interaction. Although this kind of subject matter would seem most likely to be studied by fields in the social sciences, this particular subject is most often studied by modern-day geographers. Researchers have also applied mental mapping to understand and define cognitive regions. They study it to determine subjective qualities from the public such as personal preference and practical uses of geography like driving directions.

Mass media also have a virtually direct effect on a person's mental map of the geographical world. The perceived geographical dimensions of a foreign nation (relative to one's own nation) may often be heavily influenced by the amount of time and relative news coverage that the news media may spend covering news events from that foreign region. For instance, a person might perceive a small island to be nearly the size of a continent, merely based on the amount of news coverage that they are exposed to on a regular basis.

In psychology, the term names the information maintained in the mind of an organism by means of which it may plan activities, select routes over previously traveled territories, etc. The rapid traversal of a familiar maze depends on this kind of mental map if scents or other markers laid down by the subject are eliminated before the maze is re-run.

== Background ==
Mental maps are an outcome of the field of behavioral geography. The imagined maps are considered one of the first studies that intersected geographical settings with human action. The most prominent contribution and study of mental maps was in the writings of Kevin Lynch. In The Image of the City, Lynch used simple sketches of maps created from memory of an urban area to reveal five elements of the city; nodes, edges, districts, paths and landmarks. Lynch claimed that “Most often our perception of the city is not sustained, but rather partial, fragmentary, mixed with other concerns. Nearly every sense is in operation, and the image is the composite of them all.” (Lynch, 1960, p 2.) The creation of a mental map relies on memory as opposed to being copied from a preexisting map or image. In The Image of the City, Lynch asks a participant to create a map as follows: “Make it just as if you were making a rapid description of the city to a stranger, covering all the main features. We don’t expect an accurate drawing- just a rough sketch.” (Lynch 1960, p 141) In the field of human geography mental maps have led to an emphasizing of social factors and the use of social methods versus quantitative or positivist methods. Mental maps have often led to revelations regarding social conditions of a particular space or area. Haken and Portugali (2003) developed an information view, which argued that the face of the city is its information . Bin Jiang (2012) argued that the image of the city (or mental map) arises out of the scaling of city artifacts and locations. He addressed that why the image of city can be formed , and he even suggested ways of computing the image of the city, or more precisely the kind of collective image of the city, using increasingly available geographic information such as Flickr and Twitter .

Using mental maps, we will be able to predict individual decision making and spatial selection, as well as evaluate their routing and navigation. A cognitive maps utility as a mnemonic and metaphorical device is precisely one of its other benefits as a shaper of the world and local attitudes. The first major field of study within the domain of memory maps is geography, spatial cognition and neurophysiology. This aims to understand how routes are drawn by subject from their set of subjects out into space which lead to memorization and internal representations. Overall these representations take the form of drawings, positioning in a graph, or oral/textual narratives, but are reflected as behavior is space that can be recorded as tracking items.

== Research applications ==
Mental maps have been used in a collection of spatial research. Many studies have been performed that focus on the quality of an environment in terms of feelings such as fear, desire and stress. A study by Matei et al. in 2001 used mental maps to reveal the role of media in shaping urban space in Los Angeles. The study used Geographic Information Systems (GIS) to process 215 mental maps taken from seven neighborhoods across the city. The results showed that people's fear perceptions in Los Angeles are not associated with high crime rates but are instead associated with a concentration of certain ethnicities in a given area. The mental maps recorded in the study draw attention to these areas of concentrated ethnicities as parts of the urban space to avoid or stay away from.

Mental maps have also been used to describe the urban experience of children. In a 2008 study by Olga den Besten mental maps were used to map out the fears and dislikes of children in Berlin and Paris. The study looked into the absence of children in today's cities and the urban environment from a child's perspective of safety, stress and fear.

Peter Gould and Rodney White have performed prominent analyses in the book “Mental Maps.” This book is an investigation into people's spatial desires. The book asks of its participants: “Suppose you were suddenly given the chance to choose where you would like to live- an entirely free choice that you could make quite independently of the usual constraints of income or job availability. Where would you choose to go?” (Gould, 1974, p 15) Gould and White use their findings to create a surface of desire for various areas of the world. The surface of desire is meant to show people's environmental preferences and regional biases.

In an experiment done by Edward C. Tolman, the development of a mental map was seen in rats. A rat was placed in a cross shaped maze and allowed to explore it. After this initial exploration, the rat was placed at one arm of the cross and food was placed at the next arm to the immediate right. The rat was conditioned to this layout and learned to turn right at the intersection in order to get to the food. When placed at different arms of the cross maze however, the rat still went in the correct direction to obtain the food because of the initial mental map it had created of the maze. Rather than just deciding to turn right at the intersection no matter what, the rat was able to determine the correct way to the food no matter where in the maze it was placed.

The idea of mental maps is also used in strategic analysis. David Brewster, an Australian strategic analyst, has applied the concept to strategic conceptions of South Asia and Southeast Asia. He argues that popular mental maps of where regions begin and end can have a significant impact on the strategic behaviour of states.

A collection of essays, documenting current geographical and historical research in mental maps is published by the Journal of Cultural Geography in 2018.

== See also ==
- Spatial cognition
