= Curb extension =

Traffic calming measure

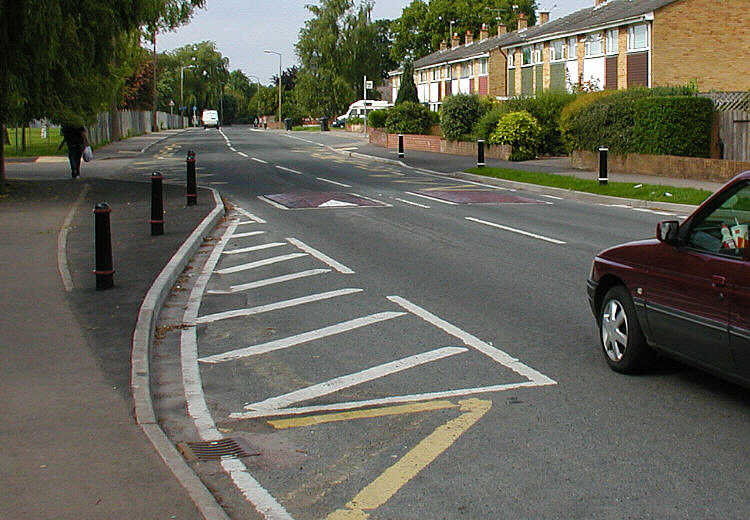
A curb extension marked by darkened tarmac and black posts

A curb extension (or also neckdown, kerb extension, bulb-out, bump-out, kerb build-out, nib, elephant ear, curb bulge, curb bulb, or blister) is a traffic calming measure which widens the sidewalk for a short distance. This reduces the crossing distance and allows pedestrians and drivers to see each other when parked vehicles would otherwise block visibility. The practice of banning car parking near intersections (with or without a curb extension) is referred to as daylighting the intersection.

A curb extension is formed by an angled narrowing of the roadway and a widening of the sidewalk. This is often accompanied by an area of enhanced restrictions (such as a "no stopping" or "no parking" zone) and the appropriate visual reinforcement. This is achieved using painted road markings (e.g. lines, coloured areas, or chevrons), barriers, bollards, or the addition of pavement or street furniture (e.g. planters, street lights, or benches).

Curb extensions are often used in combination with other traffic calming measures such as chicanes, speed bumps, or rumble strips, and are frequently sited to protect formal pedestrian crossings. In these cases the "squeeze" effect of the narrowed roadway shortens the exposed distance pedestrians must walk.

== Uses ==
Curb extensions are used to:

- Increase the visibility of pedestrians by enforcing the "daylighting" of the intersection and encouraging pedestrians to wait in a more visible area.
- Reduce crossing distances for pedestrians.
- Provide space for ramps on the sidewalk where it would otherwise be too narrow.
- Slow down traffic by visually narrowing the roadway and reducing the turning radius of drivers. This is especially useful for calming fast traffic turning from a major to a minor road.
- Shield parallel parked vehicles from oncoming traffic.
- Protect passengers embarking and particularly disembarking from trams, buses, and level-grade urban light rail systems, particularly when retrofitting existing streets. In other words, curb extensions prevent buses from needing to pull over to the side of the road to release and receive passengers.
- Provide protection for pedestrians, possibly by including a pedestrian barrier, preventing pedestrians from running straight from the premises over the road.
- Provide room for U-turns on superstreets.

Curb extensions are also used when retrofitting existing streets to accommodate congestion charging schemes - hitherto wide (sometimes multi-lane) roads are deliberately narrowed to ensure that the charging equipment can see passing vehicles, and the charging equipment (and often bollards or other barrier devices) are placed in the expanded sidewalk area (to prevent drivers from circumventing the charging system's cameras and detectors).

== Design, advantages and disadvantages ==
The Pedestrian and Bicycle Information Center, a body funded by the US Federal Highway Administration, advises that curb extensions ought not encroach on travel lanes, bicycle lanes, or shoulders, and should not extend more than 1.8 m (6 ft) from the curb. Some curb extensions are built with the bike lane passing through (making the extension an island, separated from the main sidewalk by a narrow bike lane).

One study has found that pedestrians crossing at curb extensions have to wait for fewer vehicles to pass before a motorist yields to allow them to cross. The study was too small to determine whether other measures of effectiveness were significant, such as percent of pedestrians crossing after a motorist yields.

Poorly designed curb extensions can pose a hazard to cyclists, as they force cyclists from their position at the road side (or in a roadside bike lane) into the narrowed gap. They can also damage vehicles if the curbs extend too close to traffic lanes.

Author Randal O'Toole argues that curb extensions are used to discourage the use of automobiles by reducing the number of lanes available for automobiles. In particular, curb extensions can be used to block turn lanes, forcing turning vehicles to remain with the forward moving traffic. Curb extensions do prevent drivers from using parking lanes or shoulders as right turn lanes.

However, reducing the crossing distance also reduces the time needed to cross the street. This allows a reduction in the length of the pedestrian phase at signalized intersection, and reduces the time needed to yield to pedestrians at stop sign controlled intersections. This at least partially compensated for any loss in vehicle capacity.

Curb extensions complicate drainage. They obstruct the gutter, so a catch basin is needed at the uphill end to keep a puddle from forming. An alternate solution is placing a gap in the curb, allowing the stormwater in the gutter to irrigate a rain garden or bioswale in the curb extension.

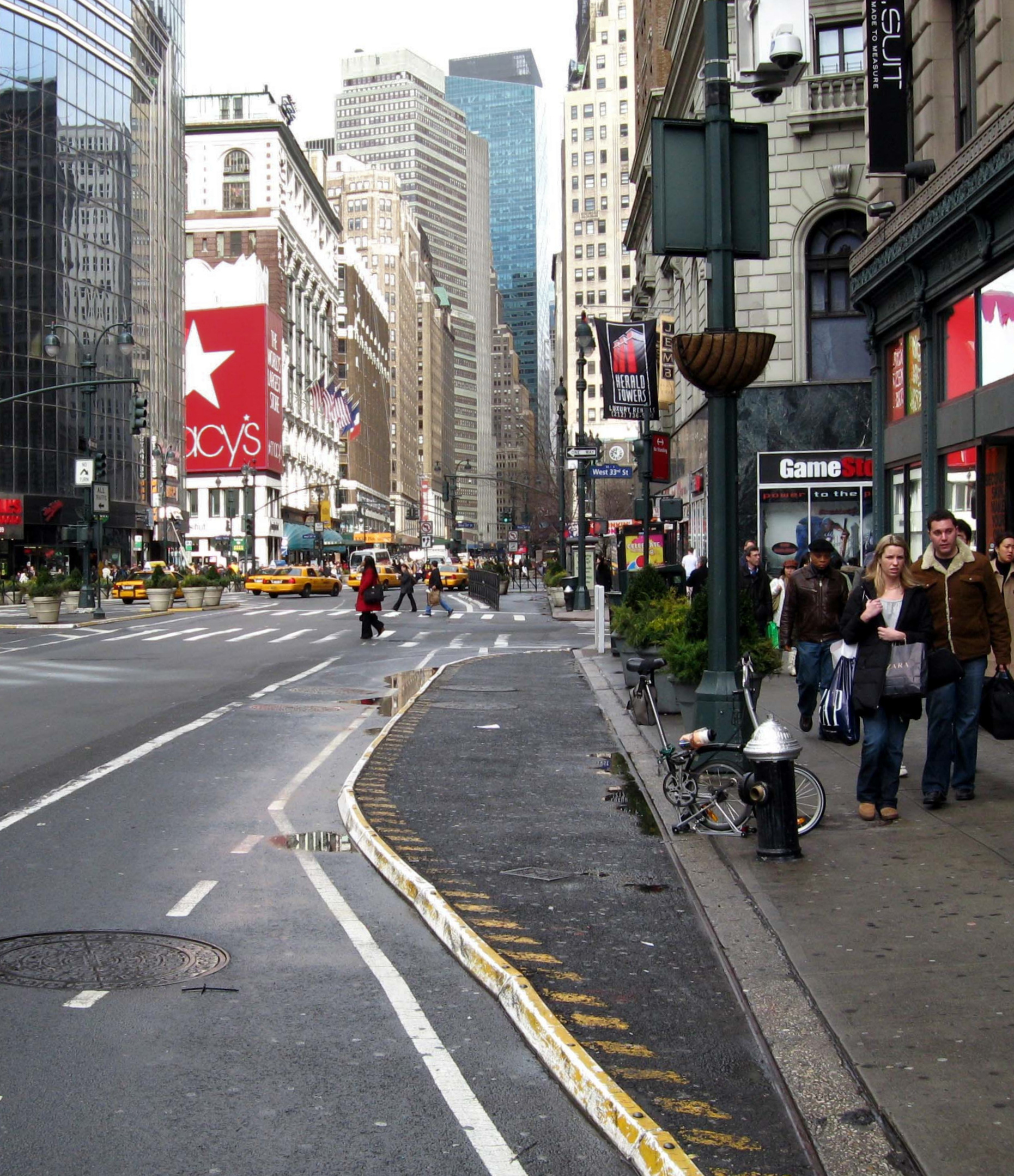
Broadway at 33rd Street, Manhattan.

To facilitate street sweeping, the internal and external curvatures of the extended curb section are moderately graduated.

Retroactively adding curb extensions to older, established communities has been controversial in some instances, due to the installation of the extensions reducing the availability of on-street parking for some properties, particularly in cases where the curb extension has been installed on its own and not in conjunction with a crosswalk.

== See also ==
- Bus bulb / border, a specific type of curb extension that is used as a bus stop
- Sneckdown, a temporary curb extension caused by snowfall
- Intersection daylighting
