= Camillo Sitte =

Austrian architect and planner (1843–1903)

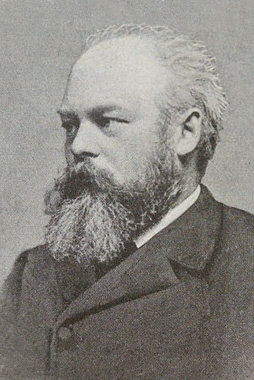
Camillo Sitte

Camillo Sitte (17 April 1843 – 16 November 1903) was an Austrian architect, painter and urban theorist whose work influenced urban planning and land use regulation. Today, Sitte is best remembered for his 1889 book The Art of Building Cities, in which he examined and documented the traditional, incremental approach to urbanism in Europe, with a close focus on public spaces in Italy and the Germanic countries.

== Career ==
Camillo Sitte was born Vienna in 1843. As the son of architect Franz Sitte, he was able to work on his father's construction sites during his youth. Camillo Sitte is the father of the architect Siegfried Sitte.

The parcellation and monumental buildings of Přívoz, Camillo Sitte (1893)

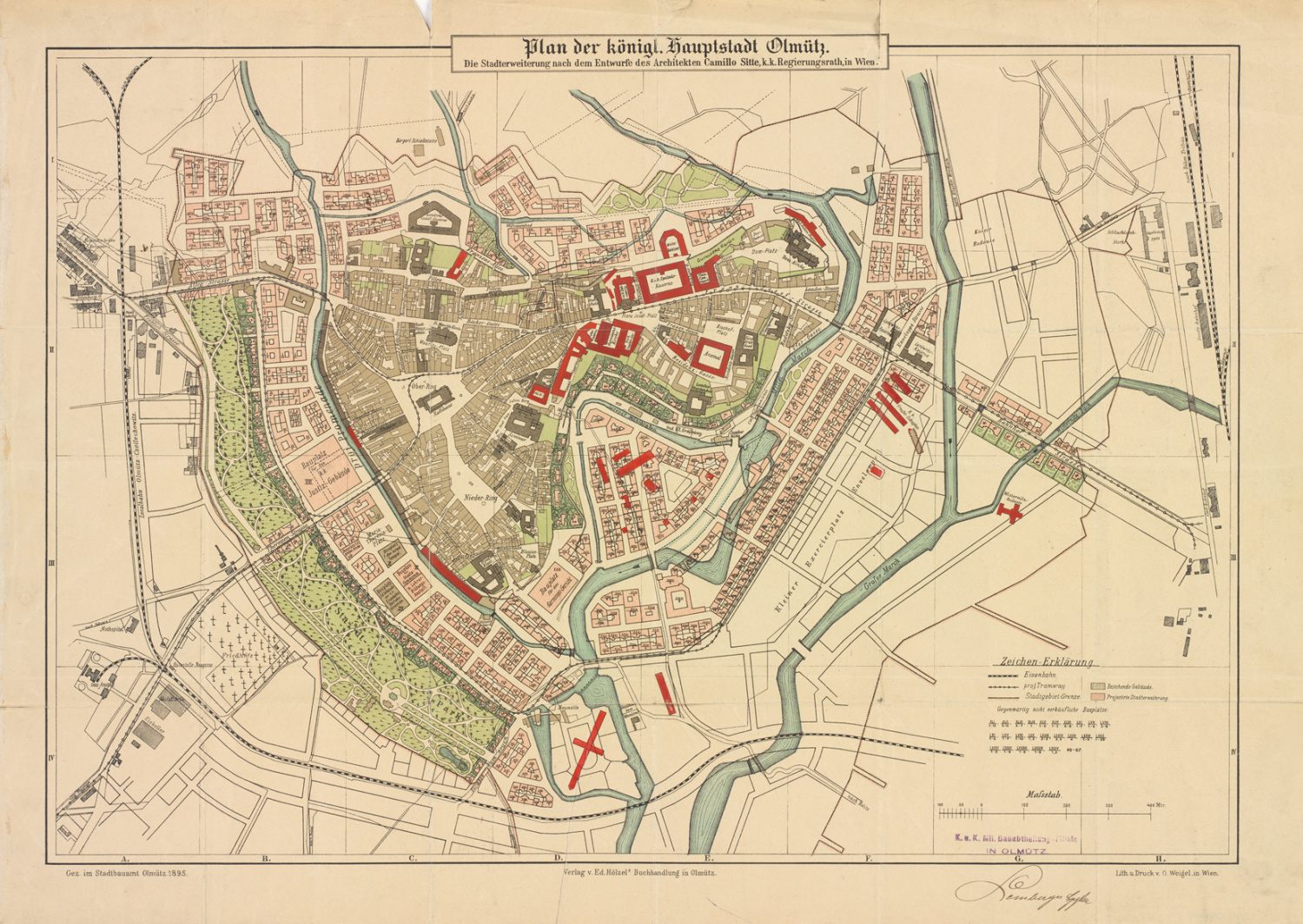
Plan of the Royal Capital City of Olomouc, Expansion of the City according to Camillo Sittes Project (1895)

Sitte was an architect and cultural theoretician whose writings, according to Eliel Saarinen, were familiar to German-speaking architects of the late 19th century. He was educated and influenced by Rudolf von Eitelberger and Heinrich von Ferstel, and on the recommendation of Eitelberger Sitte became the head of the new State Trade School in Salzburg in 1875, but Sitte returned to Vienna in 1883 to establish similar school there.. As a city planner, he developed master plans for small and medium-sized towns across the Austro-Hungarian empire (including Přívoz 1893–1895, Ljubljana 1895, Ostrava 1897, and Liberec 1901) or served as a juror and expert consultant for urban development projects (including the city expansion competition for Munich 1892–1893 and Brno 1901–1902).

Sitte traveled extensively in Europe, seeking to identify the factors that made certain towns feel warm and welcoming. Sitte saw architecture was a process and product of culture. In 1889 he published the book The Art of Building Cities (German: Der Städtebau nach seinen künstlerischen Grundsätzen). Sitte is credited with developing an aesthetic approach to architecture and urban planning that is inspired by historical cities in Germany and Italy. His efforts were a direct reaction to the fashionable excesses of architecture on Vienna's Ringstrasse.

Sitte founded the Camillo Sitte Lehranstalt and the Camillo Sitte Gasse in Vienna, and also the magazine Städtebau in 1904.

== The Art of Building Cities (1889) ==
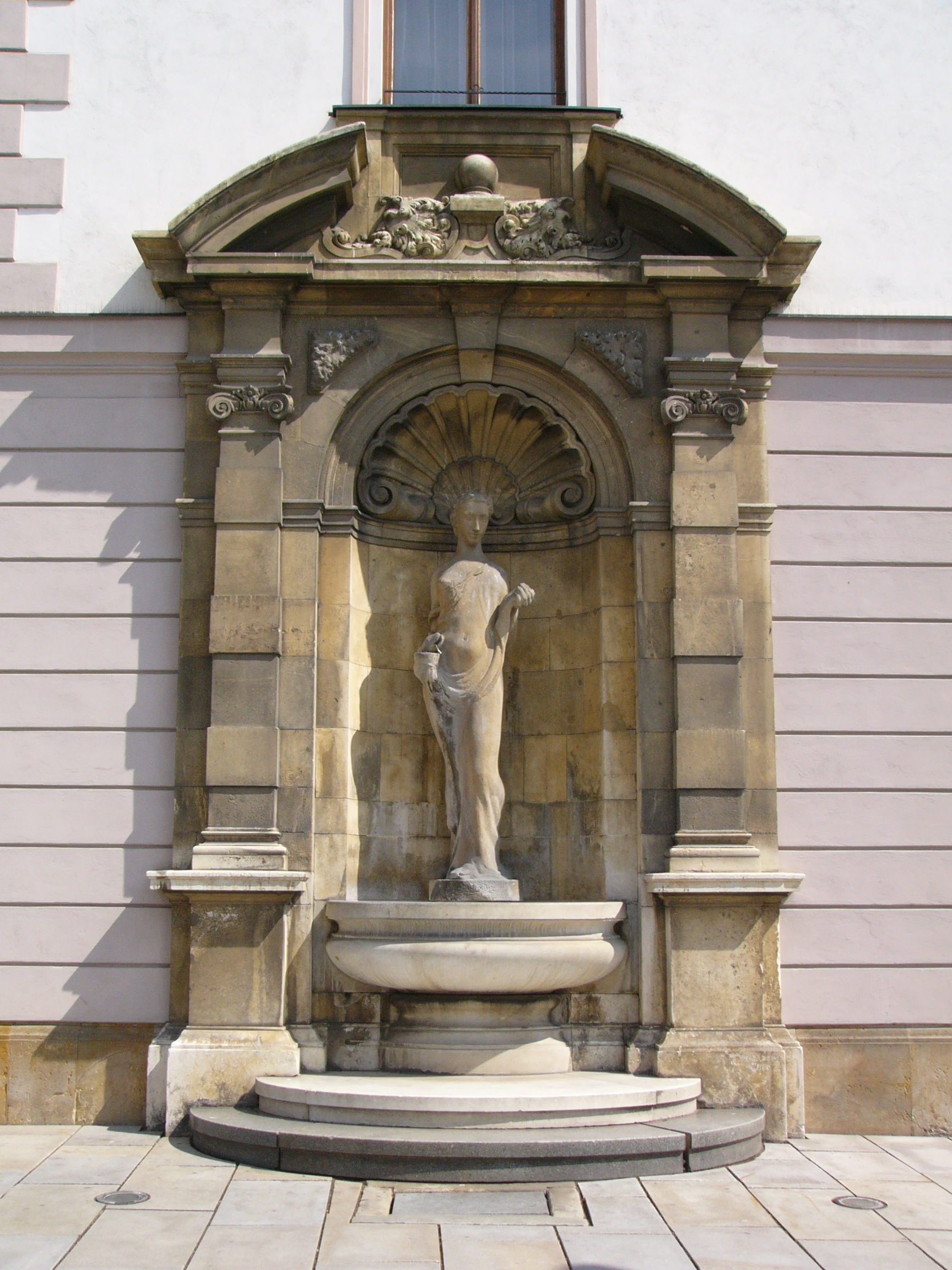
Fountain of Hygieia in Olomouc (in Czech: kašna Hygie), Camillo Sitte (plan) and Karel Lenhart (statue)

In 1889, Sitte published The Art of Building Cities. Richly illustrated with sketches and neighborhood maps, Sitte drew parallels between the elements of public spaces and those of furnished rooms, and he made a forceful case that the aesthetic experience of urban spaces should be the leading factor of urban planning. At the same time, he was highly critical of the patterns of industrial urbanism in Europe at that time, including the development of many site plans along the Ringstraße in his native Vienna.

Sitte was one of the first urban writers to consciously emphasize the value of irregularity in the urban form. He challenged, among other things, a growing tendency toward rigid symmetry in contemporary urban design, including the isolated placement of churches and monuments in large, open plots. He also identified and advocates a host of traditional approaches to creating public spaces that had grown out of the town planning traditions of Europe. He illustrates these approaches with examples through sketches and diagrams of numerous neighborhoods (mainly in Italy and Germany). Sitte believed in an incremental approach to urbanism, formed by the aggregation of many sophisticated site plans within a more general scheme determined by street patterns and other public factors. Building on some of his principles, he follows his criticism of contemporary development on Vienna's Ringstraße with proposals to improve the spatial and aesthetic dynamics of some of its major sites.

Sitte's book had an impact on European conversations about urban planning and architecture. Eliel Saarinen notes that The Art of Building Cities was familiar to German-speaking architects in the late 19th century. At least five editions were published between 1889 and 1922, including a 1902 French translation. An English translation was not published, however, until 1945—a factor that may explain his relative obscurity in the British Empire and the United States in the years before World War II. Nevertheless, Sitte's ideas made their way into the English-speaking world through the writings of the British urbanist, Raymond Unwin, who was deeply influenced by The Art of Building Cities. Sitte's theories influenced other subsequent urbanists, including Karl Henrici and Theodor Fischer. On the contrary, Modernists rejected his ideas, and Le Corbusier, in particular, is known for his dismissals of Sitte's work.

For Sitte, the inherent, creative quality of urban space is its most important factor, with whole effect being more than the sum of its parts. Sitte contended that many urban planners had neglected to consider the spatial dimensions of urban planning, focusing too much on paper plans; and argued that this approach hindered the efficacy of planning in an aesthetically conscious manner. Although most of his examples come from the urbanism of Medieval and Renaissance Europe, he also cites Classical urban forms like the agora of Athens and the Roman forum as examples of well designed urban space.

The book's colophon is a picture of a winged snail. This alludes to the ancient adage festina lente and also the Viennese delicacy, Helix pomatia, which would be sold in the snail market and cooked with butter and garlic as "poor man's oysters" and as an alternative to meat at Lent.

== Books by Sitte ==
- The Art of Building Cities, 1889
- The Birth of Modern City Planning. Dover Publications, 2006, ISBN 978-0-486-45118-3
- Gesamtausgabe. Schriften und Projekte. Hrsg. v. Klaus Semsroth, Michael Mönninger und Christine Crasemann-Collins. 6 Bände. Böhlau, Wien 2003–2007

== Literature ==
- Karin Wilhelm, Detlef Jessen-Klingenberg (Hrsg.): Formationen der Stadt. Camillo Sitte weitergelesen (= Bauwelt Fundamente; Bd. 132). Birkhäuser, Basel; Bauverlag, Gütersloh u. a. 2006, ISBN 3-7643-7152-8
- George R. Collins & Christiane Crasemann Collins. Camillo Sitte and the Birth of Modern City Planning. Random House: New York, 1965.
- Michael Mönninger: Vom Ornament zum Nationalkunstwerk. Zur Kunst- und Architekturtheorie Camillo Sittes. Vieweg, Wiesbaden 1998, ISBN 3-528-02423-2
- Leif Jerram: From Page to Policy: Camillo Sitte and Planning Practice in Munich. Manchester Papers in Economic and Social History, No. 57, September 2007. ISSN 1753-7762. An introduction to Sitte, alongside an analysis of how his ideas were actually used. Available online at https://web.archive.org/web/20140116134302/http://www.arts.manchester.ac.uk/subjectareas/history/research/manchesterpapers/ .
