= The Art of Building Cities =

1889 book by Camillo Sitte

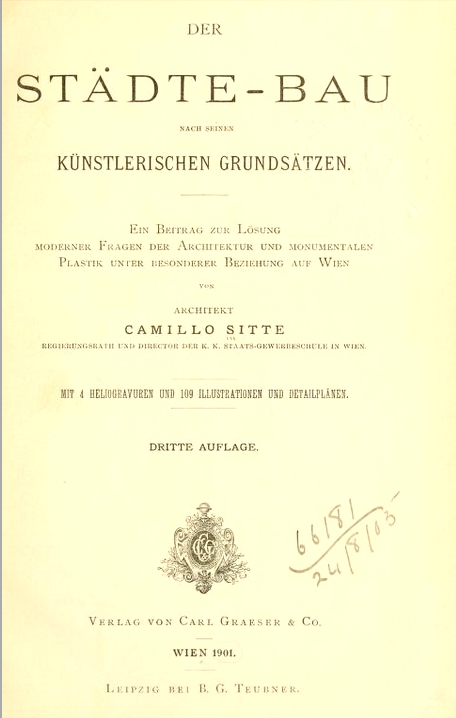
- Title page of an edition from 1901
- Author: Camillo Sitte
- Original title: Der Städtebau nach seinen künstlerischen Grundsätzen
- Translator: Charles T. Stewart
- Language: German
- Publisher: Carl Graeser & Co.
- Publication date: 1889
- Publication place: Austria-Hungary
- English publication date: 1945
- Pages: 180

The Art of Building Cities: City Building According to Its Artistic Fundamentals (German: Der Städtebau nach seinen künstlerischen Grundsätzen) is an 1889 book by the Austrian architect and urban theorist Camillo Sitte.

== Summary ==
Camillo Sitte accepts Aristotle's notion that a city needs to combine functionality and beauty. He tries to identify universal rules and patterns for how this can be achieved by studying various urban locations. The book was written in reaction to a trend of downplaying the role of beauty in city planning.

Roughly half the book consists of Sitte's studies of historical sites and their features, presenting the Baroque era as the highest point in European city planning. The other half is about common errors he sees in the 19th century. The book contains 96 maps and ground-plan drawings which Sitte uses to present his arguments about the features of well-planned urban spaces.

== Reception ==
The book became highly influential in urban planning theory and made it focus more on the spaces of cities. Karl Henrici and Theodor Fischer were among the architects who directly applied Sitte's theories to their works.

An English translation by Charles T. Stewart was published in 1945.
