= Public housing =

Residential properties owned by a government

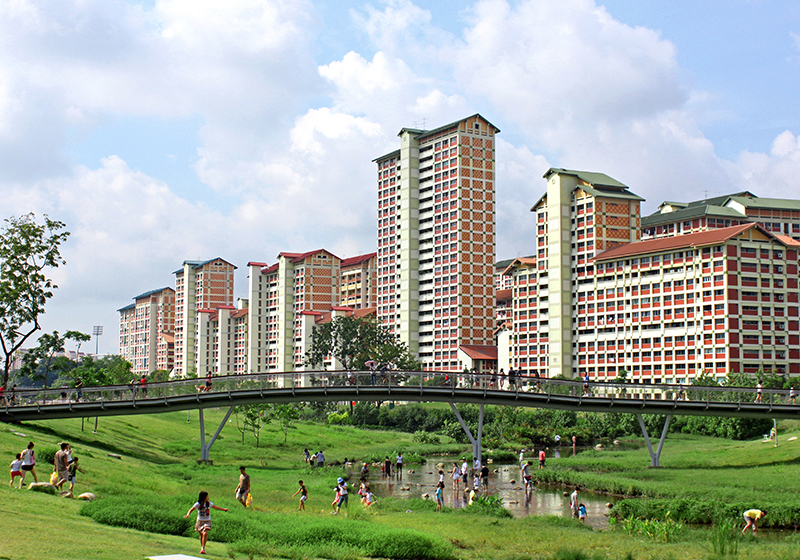
Public housing in Bishan, Singapore. Singapore's public residential developments range from studio units to executive condominiums, contributing to a 90% home-ownership rate, one of the highest in the world.

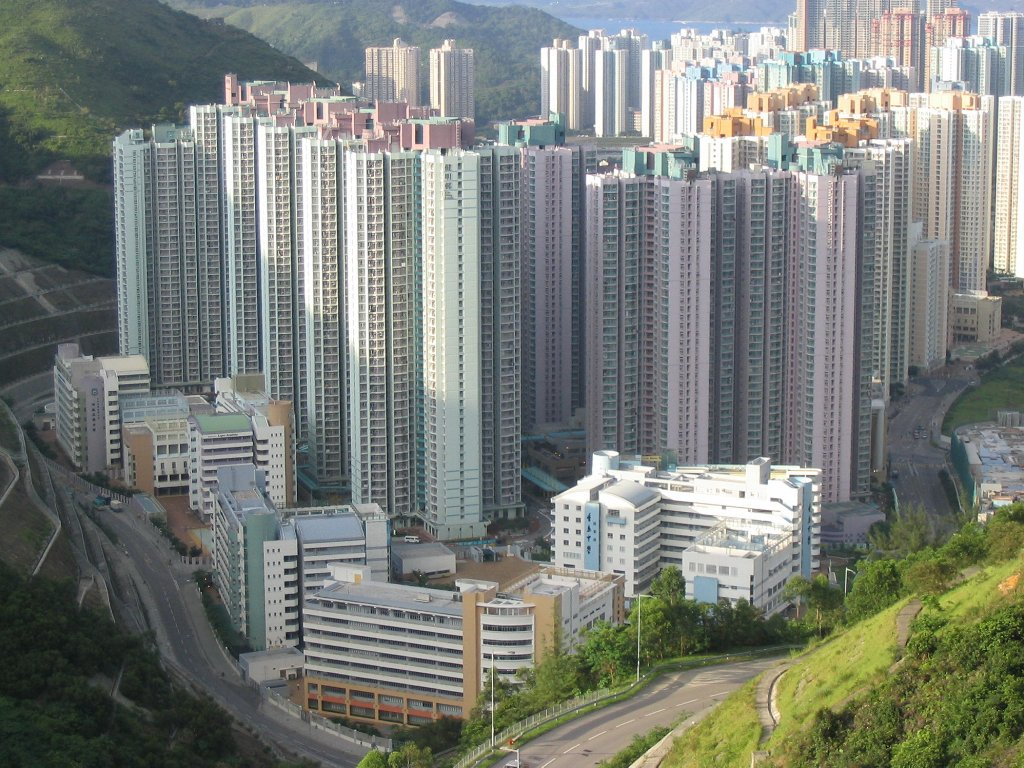
Public-housing complex in Tseung Kwan O, Hong Kong. The Kin Ming Estate comprises ten housing blocks, providing housing for approximately 22,000 people. In 2020, 2,112,138 were identified residents of public housing, which is 28% of the total population.

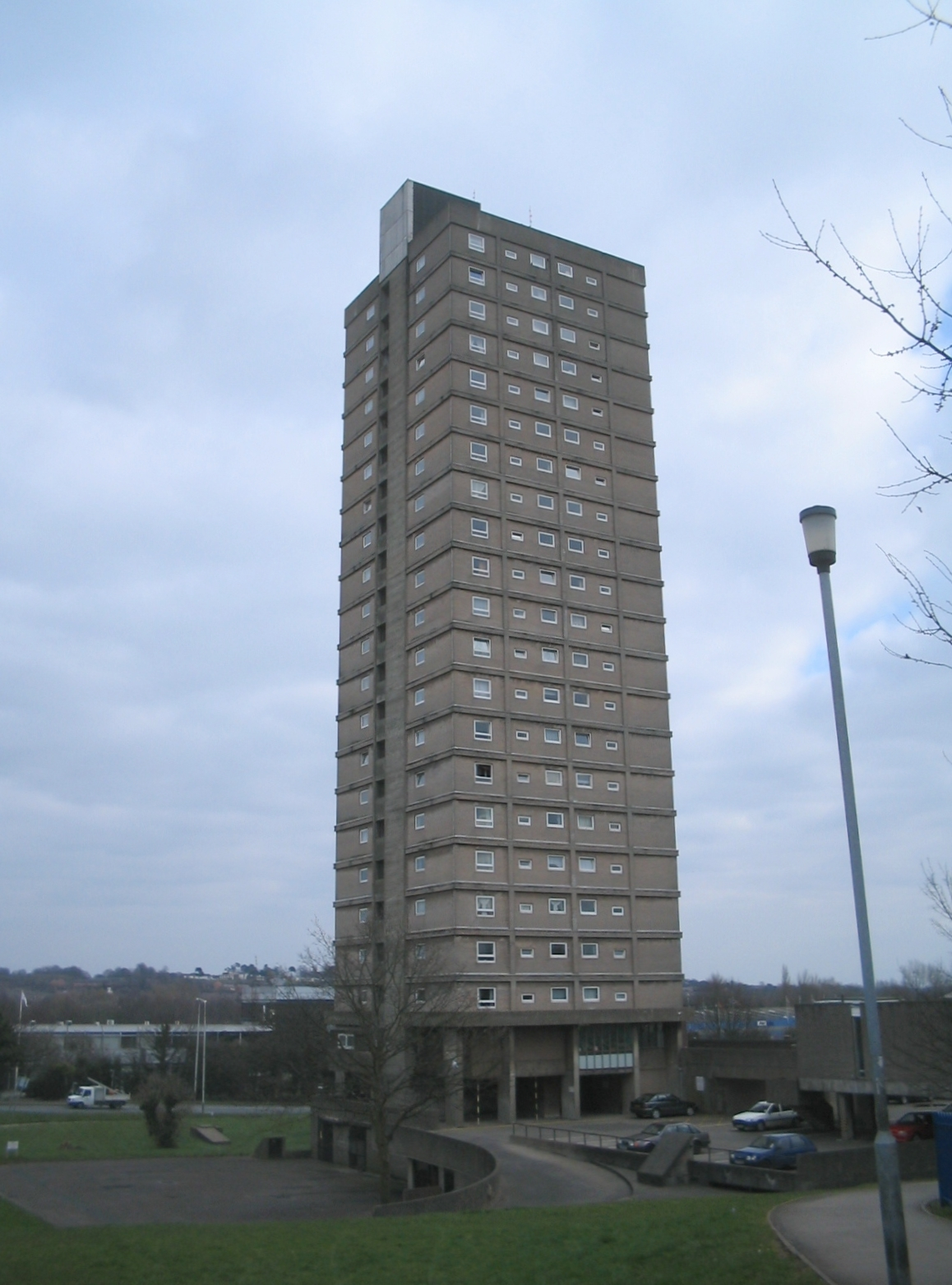
A local-authority 20-storey tower block in Cwmbran, South Wales.

Public housing, also known as social housing, is subsidized or affordable housing provided in buildings that are usually owned and managed by local government, central government, nonprofit organizations or a combination thereof. The details, terminology, definitions of poverty, and other criteria for allocation may vary within different contexts, but the right to rent such a home is generally rationed through some form of means-testing or through administrative measures of housing needs. One can regard social housing as a potential remedy for housing inequality. Within the OECD, social housing represents an average of 7% of national housing stock (2020), ranging from ~34% in the Netherlands to less than 1% in Colombia.

In the United States and Canada, public housing developments are classified as housing projects that are owned by a housing authority or a low-income (project-based voucher) property. PBV are a component of a public housing agency. PBVs, administered by state and local housing agencies, are distinct from Section 8 Project-Based Rental Assistance (PBRA), a program through which property owners' contract directly with the Department of Housing and Urban Development (HUD) to rent units to families with low incomes.

Affordable housing goals can also be achieved through subsidies. Subsidized housing is owned and operated by private owners who receive subsidies in exchange for providing affordable housing. Owners may be individual landlords or for-profit or nonprofit corporations.

== History ==
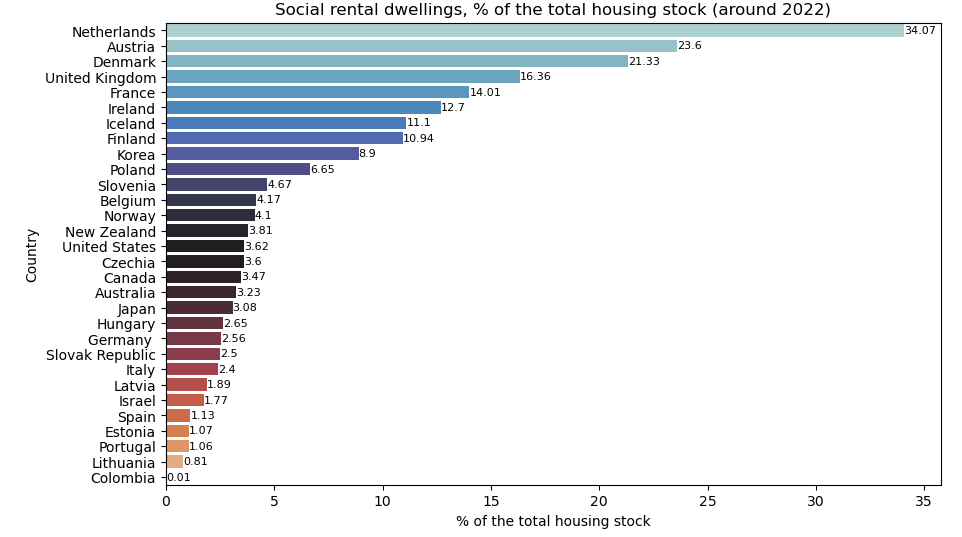
Social rental dwellings, % of the total housing stock (around 2022)

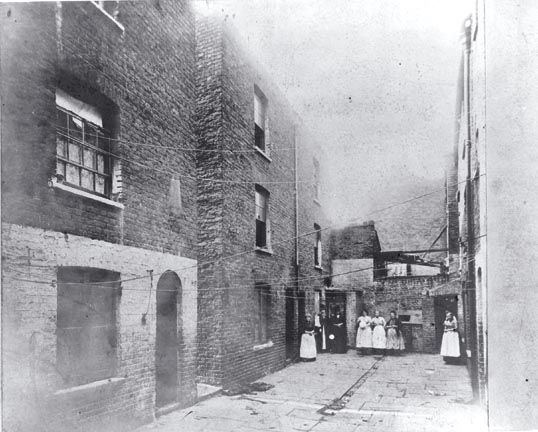
Boundary Street in 1890; three years later, the London County Council began slum clearance.

Social housing had existed sporadically prior to modern developments. The oldest still in use is the 16th-century Fuggerei in Augsburg, Bavaria.

The origins of modern municipal housing lie in the dramatic urban population increase caused by the Industrial Revolution of the 19th century. In the large cities of the period, many social commentators, such as Octavia Hill and Charles Booth reported on the squalor, sickness and immorality that arose. Henry Mayhew, visiting Bethnal Green, wrote in The Morning Chronicle:

... roads were unmade, often mere alleys, houses small and without foundations, subdivided and often around unpaved courts. An almost total lack of drainage and sewerage was made worse by the ponds formed by the excavation of brickearth. Pigs and cows in back yards, noxious trades like boiling tripe, melting tallow, or preparing cat's meat, and slaughter houses, dustheaps, and "lakes of putrefying night soil" added to the filth.

Some philanthropists began to provide housing in tenement blocks, and some factory owners built entire villages for their workers, such as Saltaire in 1853 and Port Sunlight in 1888. It was in 1885, after the report from a royal commission in England, that the state first took an interest. This led to the Housing of the Working Classes Act 1885, which empowered local authorities to shut down unhealthy properties and encouraged them to improve the housing in their areas.

The City of London Corporation built tenements in the Farringdon Road in 1865. The world's first large-scale housing project was built in London to replace one of the capital's most notorious slums – the Old Nichol. Nearly 6,000 individuals were crammed into the packed streets, where one child in four died before his or her first birthday. Arthur Morrison wrote the influential A Child of the Jago, an account of the life of a child in the slum, which sparked a public outcry. Construction of the Boundary Estate was begun in 1890 by the Metropolitan Board of Works and completed by the then-recently formed London County Council in 1900.

The success of this project spurred many local councils to embark on similar construction schemes in the early 20th century. The Arts and Crafts movement and Ebenezer Howard's garden city ideas led to the leafy London County Council cottage estates such as firstly Totterdown Fields and later Wormholt and Old Oak. The First World War indirectly provided a new impetus, when the poor physical health and condition of many urban recruits to the British Army was noted with alarm. In 1916, 41% of conscripts were unfit to serve. This led to a campaign known as homes fit for heroes and in 1919 the government first compelled councils to provide housing, helping them to do so through the provision of subsidies, under the Housing, Town Planning, &c. Act 1919. Public housing projects were tried out in some European countries and the United States in the 1930s, but only became widespread globally after the Second World War.

== Africa ==
=== South Africa ===
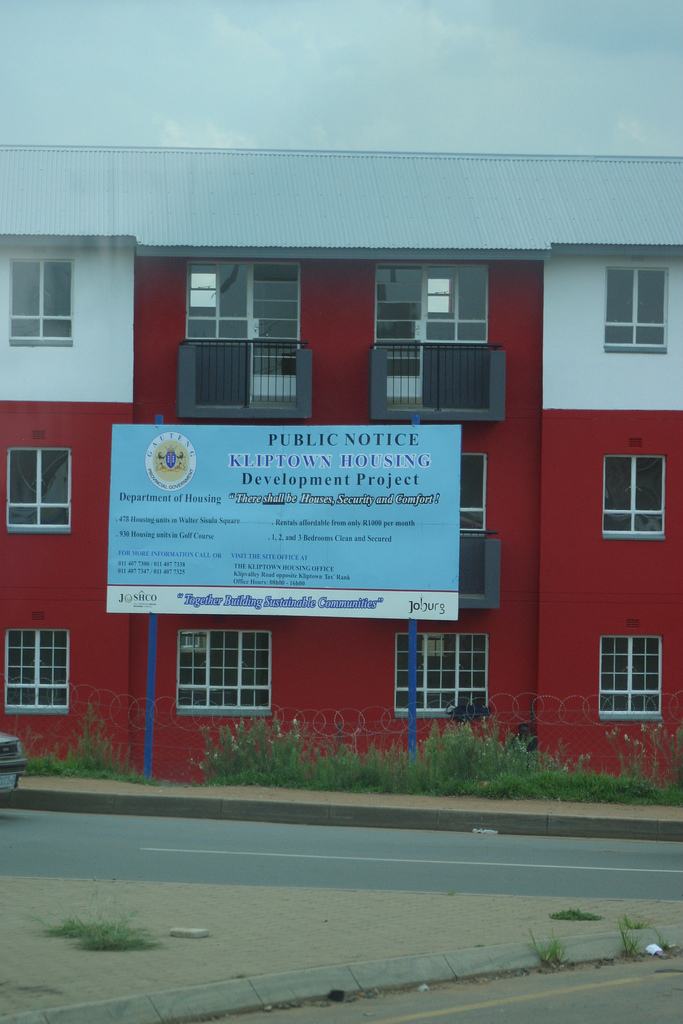
Housing development project in Kliptown, Soweto, Greater Johannesburg.

South Africa has a significant amount of public housing, and the country's social democratic government, majority run by the African National Congress, continues to build more, in an effort to ensure that all residents have adequate housing.

==== Constitutionally-enshrined right to housing ====
The Constitution of South Africa recognizes the right to housing, and states that access to adequate housing is a basic human right.

The Constitution further states that the Government of South Africa is obligated to take reasonable steps, in the context of its available resources, to progressively achieve this right. This includes, through reasonable legislative and other measures, the implementation of housing programs and policies.

==== Current state of housing access ====
Social housing in South Africa falls under the mandate of the Department of Human Settlements (DHS), which is headed by the government's Minister of Human Settlements, and had (as of the 2022/2023 financial year) over 500 employees. The Department had a 2024/2025 fiscal year budget of R33.6 billion.

What constitutes adequate housing is outlined in the Housing Act 107 of 1997, the BNG 2004 policy, and the National Housing Code 2009 (NHC), which provide for the facilitation of a sustainable housing development process. The NHC specifies the minimum size of houses as 40 square meters of floor area with 2 bedrooms; a separate bathroom with a toilet, a shower and a hand basin; a combined living area and kitchen space with a wash basin; and an electrical installation, where electricity supply is available.

The DHS' Master Spatial Plan (MSP) is aimed at achieving a creative balance between spatial equity, economic competitiveness, and environmental sustainability to overcome the legacy of apartheid. The MSP states that all spatial development programs should incorporate spatial justice (integration); spatial sustainability (e.g., location and access to employment opportunities); spatial resilience (e.g., mixed use, incremental development); spatial quality (e.g., diversity and choice); spatial efficiency (e.g., optimal use of limited resources); and good administration under the guidance of Spatial Planning and Land use Management Act (SPLUMA Act).

Anyone in South Africa over the age of 21, with a household income not exceeding R3,500 per month, can apply for social housing, provided they do not already own a home under a separate scheme (such as a home loan from a bank). Only one government-provided home per applicant is allowable. Married persons, as well as single parents with dependents, can apply together. Applications can be submitted at the Housing Office of the resident's local municipality. Generally, homes received from the government may not be sold within the first 8 years of ownership.

For qualifying poor or low-income households, the government of South Africa also provides subsidized waste management and sanitation services, as well as 6 kl of free water, and 50 kwh of free electricity, per household, per month.

As of 2022, approximately 29.9% of South Africans resided in social housing.

The country has made significant progress in the provision of housing. The number of official households doubled between 1996 and 2022. The number of formal dwellings increased from 65.1% to 88.5% over the same period.

In the same period, the number of people living in an informal dwelling decreased from 16.2% to 8.1%, and the number of people living in traditional dwellings decreased from 18.3% to 3.1% - a marked improvement. Access to electricity at home also improved considerably, rising from 58.1% in 1996 to 94.7% in 2022. These data from Statistics South Africa (Stats SA), obtained from census research, show the positive results of the South African government's efforts towards housing access across the country.

==== Historical provision of housing ====
During the apartheid period in South Africa, spanning around 40 years, the national government at the time was run by the right-wing, conservative, Afrikaner nationalist National Party. The party intentionally only worked to ensure adequate housing for white people. As was the case in all facets of life, people of color were not afforded the protections that white people were, nor did they benefit in the same way from government funding.

This resulted in a severe lack of safe, quality housing for non-white residents in South Africa. That is an issue which persists into the present day, due to generational (hereditary) privilege, and those from previously disadvantaged communities still having to wait for adequate housing, as part of a backlog of applicants that South Africa's national, provincial, and municipal governments are continuously attending to.

Apartheid featured high poverty rates amongst black South Africans, due to racial segregation and discrimination, and this was (and still is) intrinsically connected to housing, in that adequate housing is known to provide a foundation for improving one's life through having additional security, becoming educated, and seeking employment.

The post-apartheid government has sought to build social housing with a focus on those living in poverty, and those with low incomes. This focus has been placed on building homes in urban areas, with higher levels of economic opportunity as compared to rural areas (Bantustans), where people of color were forcibly placed after being removed from existing housing, as part of racial segregation measures.

The Reconstruction and Development Program (implemented by the Cabinet of South Africa's first President, Nelson Mandela), as well as the Breaking New Ground program, provided over 3.5 million new homes during the period 1995 through 2020, but they did not fully meet demand, and some houses were built away from urban areas. The housing shortage was estimated to be 3.7 million units in 2021. The Department of Human Settlements, which facilitates national housing development, has sought to transition from a housing-focused development model to a holistic view, including services.

== Americas ==
=== Brazil ===
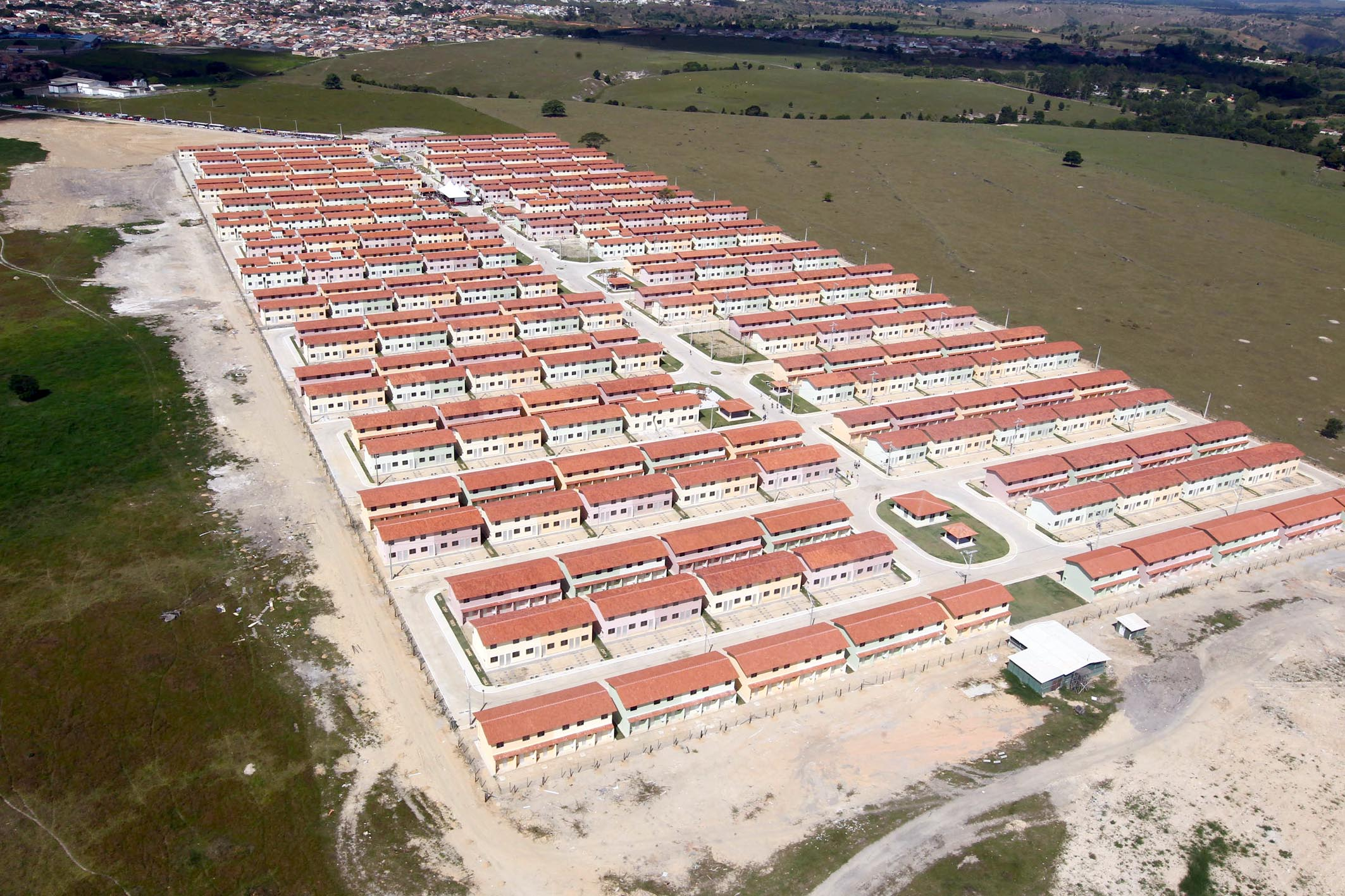
Social housing in Eunápolis, Brazil.

Minha Casa Minha Vida ("My House, My Life"), the Brazilian federal government's social housing program, was launched in March 2009 with a budget of R$36 billion (US$18 billion) to build one million homes. The second stage of the program, included within the government Growth Acceleration Program (PAC, Programa de Aceleração do Crescimento) was announced in March 2010. This stage foresaw the construction of a further two million homes.

All funds for Minha Casa Minha Vida properties were provided by the Brazilian public bank, Caixa Econômica Federal. The bank financed development and provided mortgages for qualifying families.

As of September 2018, 4.5 million homes were built and distributed to the population. The project has been criticized for its placement and quality of the houses. Houses are built far from the city centre to reduce housing costs which consequently reduces access to the labor market; a study of randomly selected houses of the MCMV project in Rio de Janeiro showed a reduced likelihood of being formally employed in job-seekers but income was not affected in those who were already employed.

In addition to addressing the housing deficit, Minha Casa Minha Vida sought to stimulate the economy by generating employment in the construction sector. According to the Brazilian Chamber of Construction Industry (CBIC), the program created millions of jobs, directly and indirectly, contributing to the country's economic growth during its initial phases. However, critics argue that the program's focus on mass production sometimes overlooked the importance of integrating new housing developments with adequate infrastructure, such as schools, healthcare facilities, and transportation networks, which are essential for fostering sustainable urban development.

=== Canada ===
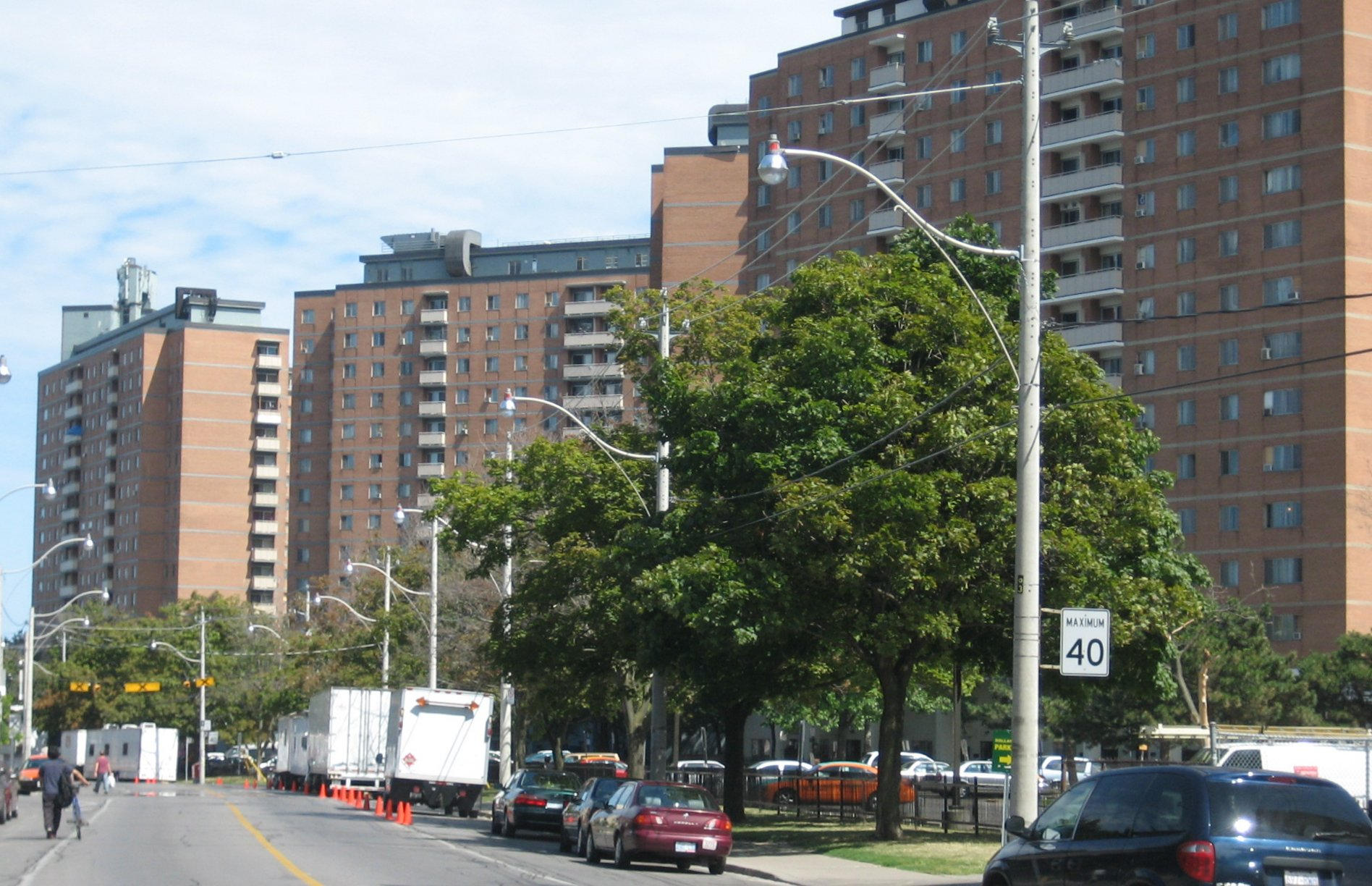
Moss Park in Downtown Toronto.

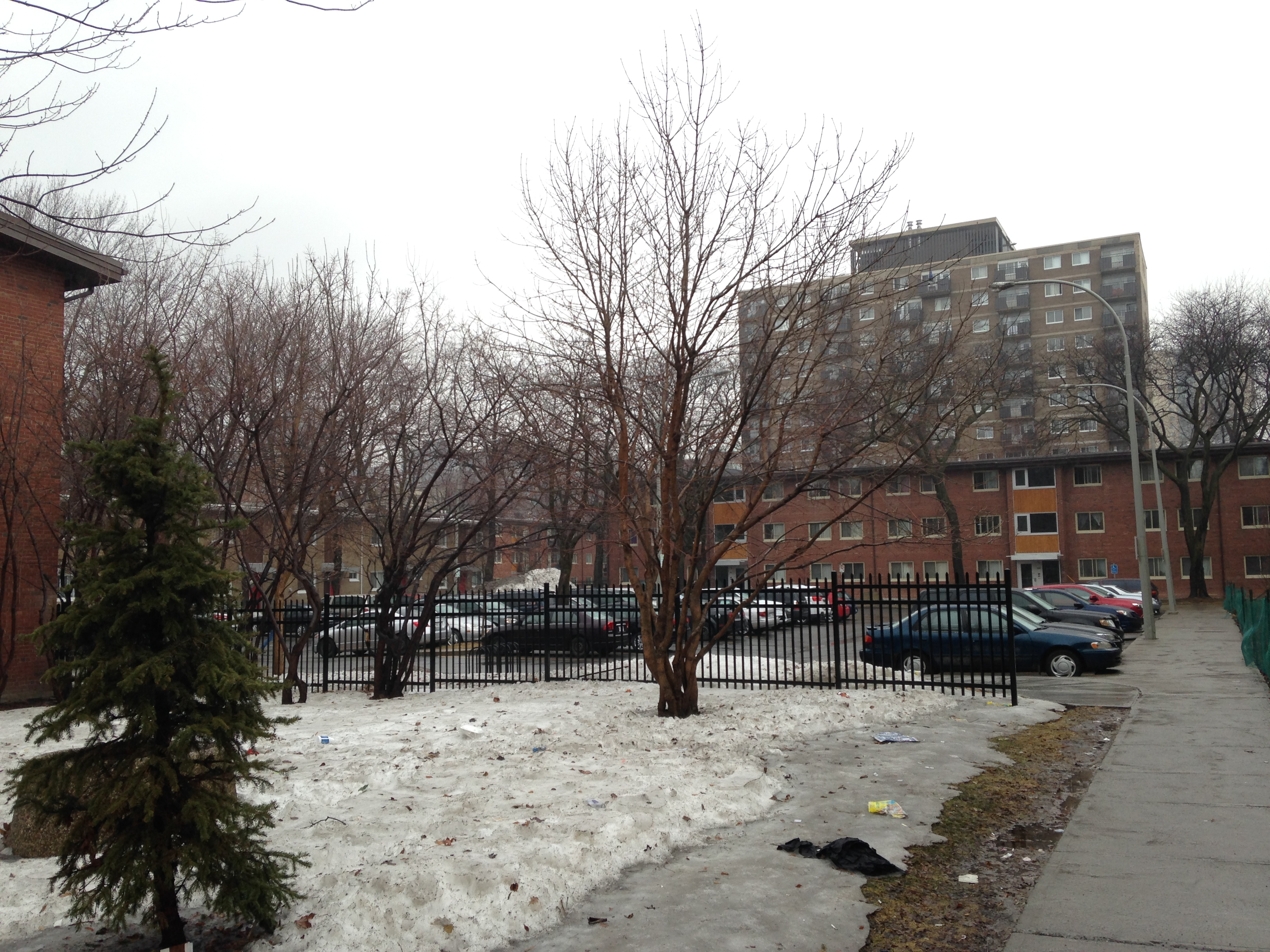
Habitations Jeanne-Mance in Downtown Montreal.

In Canada, public housing is usually a block of purpose-built subsidized housing operated by a government agency, often simply referred to as community housing, with easier-to-manage townhouses. Many cities in Canada still maintain large high-rise clustered developments in working-class neighborhoods, a system that has fallen out of favour in both the United States and the United Kingdom. However, many public housing corporations still offer a variety of buildings and communities ranging from individual houses to townhouse communities and mid-rise and high-rise apartments in both working-class and middle-class neighborhoods that house a significant number of low-income Canadians.

Following the decentralisation of public housing to local municipalities, Social Housing Services Corporation (SHSC) was created in the Province of Ontario in 2002 to provide group services for social housing providers (public housing, non-profit housing and co-operative housing). It is a non-profit corporation which provides Ontario housing providers and service managers with bulk purchasing, insurance, investment and information services that add significant value to their operations.

Recently, there has been a move toward the integration of public housing with market housing and other uses. Revitalization plans for properties such as in the notorious Downtown Eastside of Vancouver, Regent Park, in Toronto, and Rochester Heights in Ottawa, aim to provide better accommodations for low-income residents, and connect them to the greater community. The aim of the reconstruction plans are often to better integrate it into the traditional grid of streets, improve leisure and cultural amenities. However, the residents of these communities often have had little effective input in the plans and have had mixed reactions to the construction.

In 2014, Vancouver, long considered one of the least affordable cities in the world, changed the definition of social housing to mean rental housing in which a minimum of 30 percent of dwelling units are occupied by households that cannot pay market rents, due to lack of income.

=== Mexico ===
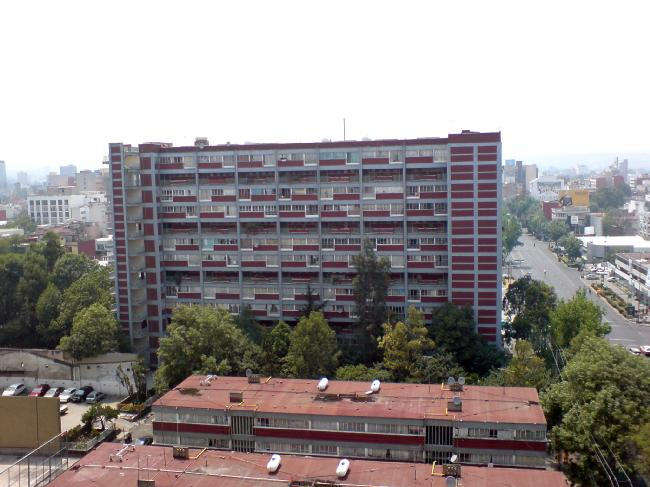
Multifamiliar Miguel Alemán.

At the end of the Second World War, enriched by US investments and an oil boom, Mexico had its first demographic boom, in which the primary destination for rural immigrants was Mexico City. Mario Pani Darqui, a famous architect at time, was charged to build its first large-scale public housing project. Built for the Dirección de Pensiones Civiles y Retiro (the National Pensions office, today ISSSTE), the Centro Urbano (or Multifamiliar) Presidente Alemán (1947–50) in the Colonia del Valle and the Centro Urbano (or Multifamiliar) Benito Juárez (1951–52) in the Colonia Roma, introduced formal ideas from Le Corbusier's Ville Radieuse into the urban fabric.

His later project, the Conjunto Urbano Tlatelolco Nonoalco built in 1960–65, was meant to develop one of the poorest parts of the city, Santiago Tlatelolco, which was becoming a slum. Unfortunately, after a while, instead of giving the residences to the previous residents of Tlatelolco, corruption took place and most of the dwellings were handed to state employees.

During the earthquake of 1985, both the Benito Juárez and Nonoalco-Tlaltelolco complexes suffered major damage, with some buildings collapsing. Today most of the Multifamiliar Benito Juárez has been demolished.

Mexico has had experience with housing projects since Porfirio Díaz's regime (1877–1880, 1884–1911). One of those still remains and is the Barrio of Loreto in San Ángel, Álvaro Obregón in Mexico City, that was a project for a paper factory workers.

Another notable public housing project is the Conjunto Habitacional Independencia, located near Tizapán neighborhood, on most of the land that once was the Matsumoto Hacienda. The project was developed during Adolfo López Mateos presidential period, started in 1959 and completed in 1960. The development included an integral design considering landscaping, and premises that could provide basic services to the residents: a clinic, a sports complex, theater, movie theater, a supermarket, a kindergarten, three elementary schools, among others. It functioned as public housing until 1982, when the houses and apartments were sold to the residents.

=== Puerto Rico ===
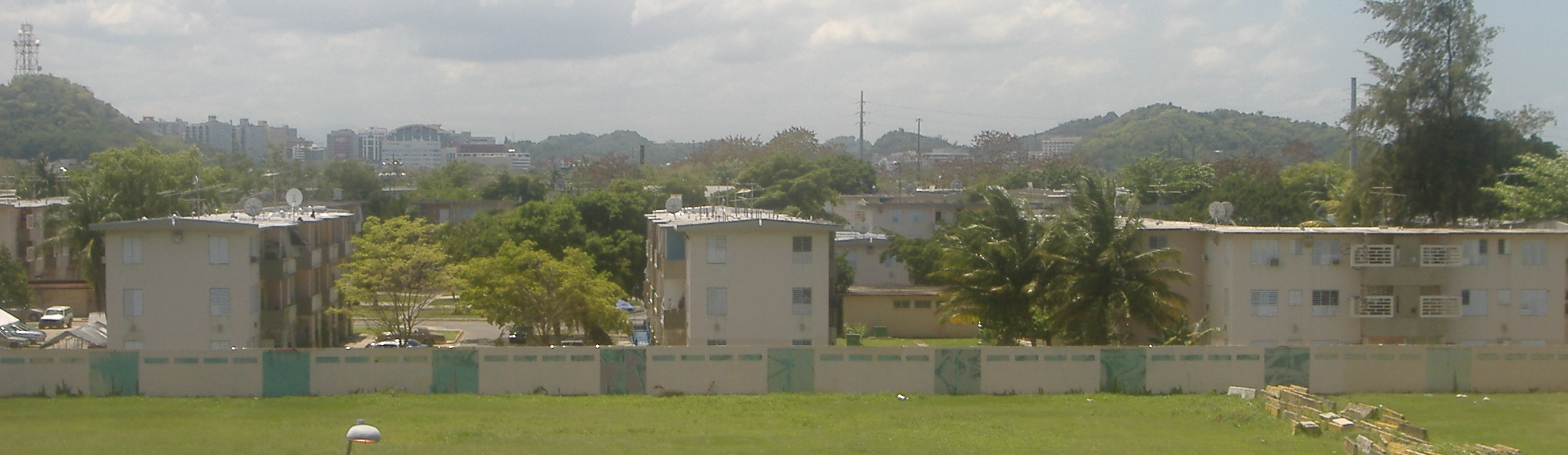
Public housing near Plaza Las Américas, San Juan.

Neighbourhoods in Puerto Rico are often divided into three types: barrio, urbanización (urbanisation) and residencial público (public housing). An urbanización is a type of housing where land is developed into lots, often by a private developer, and where single-family homes are built.

More recently, non-single-family units, such as condominiums and townhouses are being built which also fall into this category. (In Puerto Rico, a condominium is a housing unit located in a high-rise building. It is popularly called an apartamento (English: 'apartment'), whether or not its resident owns the unit or lives in it as a renter.)

Public housing, on the other hand, are housing units built with government funding, primarily through programs of the US Department of Housing and Urban Development (HUD) and the US Department of Agriculture (USDA). These have traditionally been multi-family dwellings in housing complexes called a Barriada or a Caserío (and more recently a Residencial Publico), where all exterior grounds are shared areas.

Increasingly, however, public housing developments are being built that consist of other than the traditional multi-family dwellings with all exterior grounds consisting of shared outside area, for example, public housing may consist of single family garden apartments units. Finally, a home that is located in neither an urbanizacion nor of a public housing development is said to be located in (and to be a part of) a barrio.

In Puerto Rico, a barrio also has a second and very different meaning official meaning: the geographical area into which a municipios is divided for official administrative purposes. In this sense, urbanizaciones as well as public housing developments (as well as one or several barrios in the popular sense) may be located in one of these 901 official geographic areas.

=== United States ===
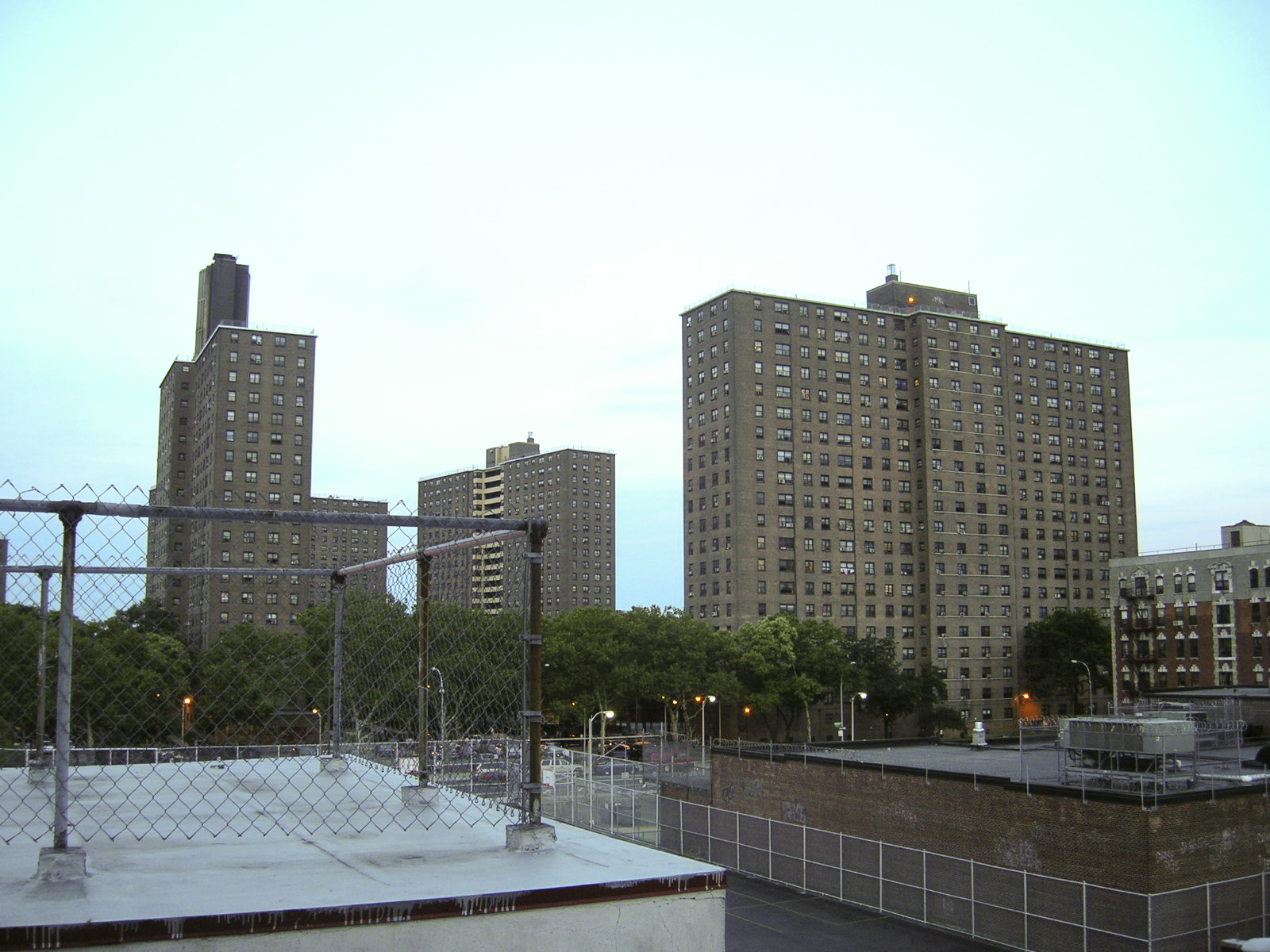
The 20-story John Francis Hylan Houses in the Bushwick section of Brooklyn, New York City.

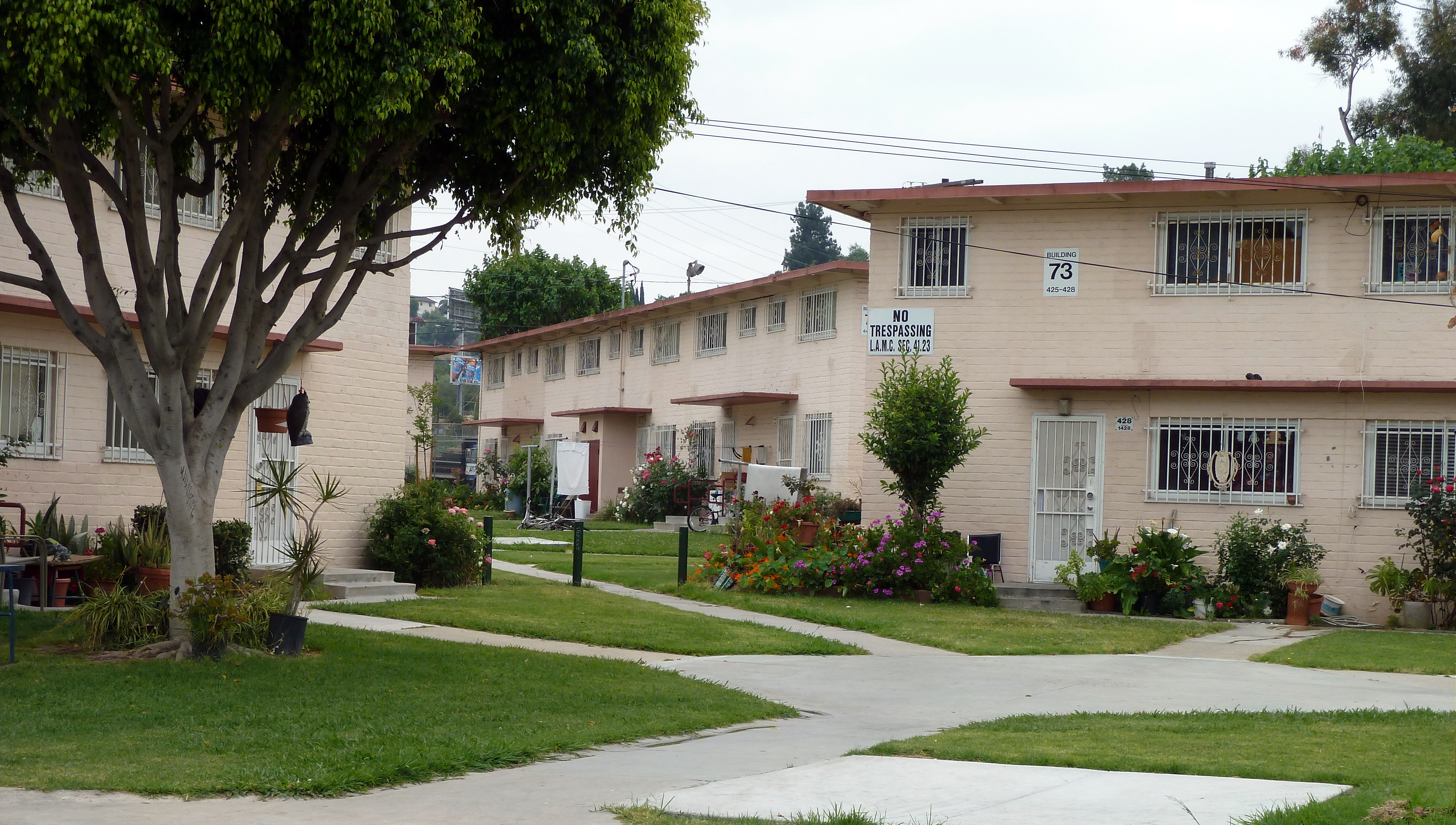
The Ramona Gardens projects in Los Angeles, California.

In the nineteenth and early twentieth centuries, government involvement in housing for the poor was chiefly in the introduction of building standards. Atlanta, Georgia's Techwood Homes, dedicated in 1935, was the nation's first public housing project. Most housing communities were developed from the 1930s onward and initial public housing was largely slum clearance, with the requirement insisted upon by private builders that for every unit of public housing constructed, a unit of private housing would be demolished.

This also eased concerns of the establishment by eliminating or altering neighborhoods commonly considered a source of disease, and reflected progressive-era sanitation initiatives. Moreover, public housing, along with the Federal Highway Program, demolished the older, substandard housing of communities of color across the United States.

However, the advent of makeshift tent communities during the Great Depression caused concern in the Administration. The Federal public housing program was created by the 1937 Act, in which operations were "sustained primarily by tenant rents." As a result, public housing in its earliest decades was usually much more working-class and middle-class and white than it was by the 1970s. Many Americans associate large, multi-story towers with public housing, but early projects were actually low-rise, though Le Corbusier superblocks caught on before World War II.

A unique US public housing initiative was the development of subsidized middle-class housing during the late New Deal (1940–42) under the auspices of the Mutual Ownership Defense Housing Division of the Federal Works Agency under the direction of Colonel Lawrence Westbrook. These eight projects were purchased by the residents after the Second World War and as of 2009 seven of the projects continue to operate as mutual housing corporations owned by their residents. These projects are among the very few definitive success stories in the history of the US public housing effort.

Public housing was only built with the blessing of the local government, and projects were almost never built on suburban greenfields, but through regeneration of older neighborhoods. The destruction of tenements and eviction of their low-income residents consistently created problems in nearby neighborhoods with "soft" real estate markets.

Initiatives in housing policy were implemented in ways that perpetuated stigma against African Americans. Initially, public housing was intended to be built widespread, and as such be mixed-income, but lobbyists who did not want to see public housing decrease their housing values blocked such housing from going up. These early NIMBY movements limited where public housing was concentrated: predominantly in low-income neighborhoods. With the introduction of suburbs and expansion of choices for the white working class, the demographics of public housing changed from more class and racially integrated to predominantly impoverished, single-parent, welfare, and people of color. This led to stigmatization of public housing, through pushing the narrative that people living in public housing were "Welfare Queens", or otherwise living in a state of abject poverty and terrible conditions. These demographic changes also decreased support for housing, leading to the government cutting funding for the program. Because of funding cuts and mismanagement by public housing authorities, public housing started to reflect modern associated characteristics of "soul-crushing" buildings or "humanitarian disasters"—to which the 1993 HOPE VI project's response was demolition.

The federal Housing and Urban Development (HUD) department's 1993 HOPE VI program addressed concerns of distressed properties and blighted superblocks with revitalization and funding projects for the renewal of public housing to decrease its density and allow for tenants with mixed income levels. The project paired together the demolition of public housing stock and private development, leading to the displacement of many residents. One of the biggest components of this was the repealing of the "one-for-one" replacement rule, which said that for every unit of housing destroyed a new one must be built. HOPE VI's reasoning for repealing this policy was that it was hindering the construction of new, mixed-income units: since the public housing buildings were so massive, those behind HOPE VI believed that trying to match the 'one-for-one' rule would make building new housing extremely difficult. The long-term effect of this was that more housing was demolished than built, and many people were displaced without being guaranteed a spot in the new housing that would get built. This led to the widespread displacement and reshuffling of public house residents: namely, low-income, Black, single-parent families. Narratives that public housing projects were full of crime, drugs, and poverty were used to further justify demolition and destruction of public housing. Such associations between crime, surveillance and policing, and the projects increased in 1996.

Projects continue to have a reputation for violence, drug use, and prostitution, especially in New Orleans, Washington, D.C. Chicago and Detroit, leading to the passage of a 1996 federal "one strike you're out" law, enabling the eviction of tenants convicted of crimes, especially drug-related, or merely as a result of being tried for some crimes. Specifically, the Clinton era established, through HUD, the Public Housing Drug Elimination Program, which led to the cracking down of public housing, leading to more policing and surveillance for low-income people of color.

==== Turn to subsidized housing ====
In the 60s and 70s, the popularization of neoliberalism caused a turn away from public sector solutions towards private or public-private solutions. This, in conjunction with the narrative of public housing being obsolete, led to both the turn away from public housing and towards subsidized housing solutions.

Houses, apartments or other residential units are usually subsidized on a rent-geared-to-income (RGI) basis. Some communities have now embraced a mixed income, with both assisted and market rents, when allocating homes as they become available.

A significant change in the program took place in 1969, with the passage of the Brooke Amendment. Rents now became set at 25% of a tenant's income with the result that the program began serving the "poorest tenants."

Other attempts to solve these problems include the 1974 Section 8 Housing Program, which encourages the private sector to construct affordable homes, and subsidized public housing. This assistance can be "project-based", subsidizing properties, or "tenant-based", which provides tenants with a voucher, accepted by some landlords. This policy option represented a turn away from the public-sector policy of public housing, instead turning towards the private market to address housing needs. The program, in conjunction with HOPE VI, was intended to create income-integrated communities, by giving residents the choice of where to move. However, the housing voucher program has historically had long wait times and limited choice on where one can actually move. Additionally, it was found that many people of color did not want to move away from their families, communities, and systems of support, as well as experiencing stigma and difficulties with landlords, safety, or expenses. This leads to the program doing little to actually create a more racially-integrated city demographics, mostly reproducing inequality while simultaneously not having enough valid housing units for the long list of applicants.

== Asia ==
=== China ===
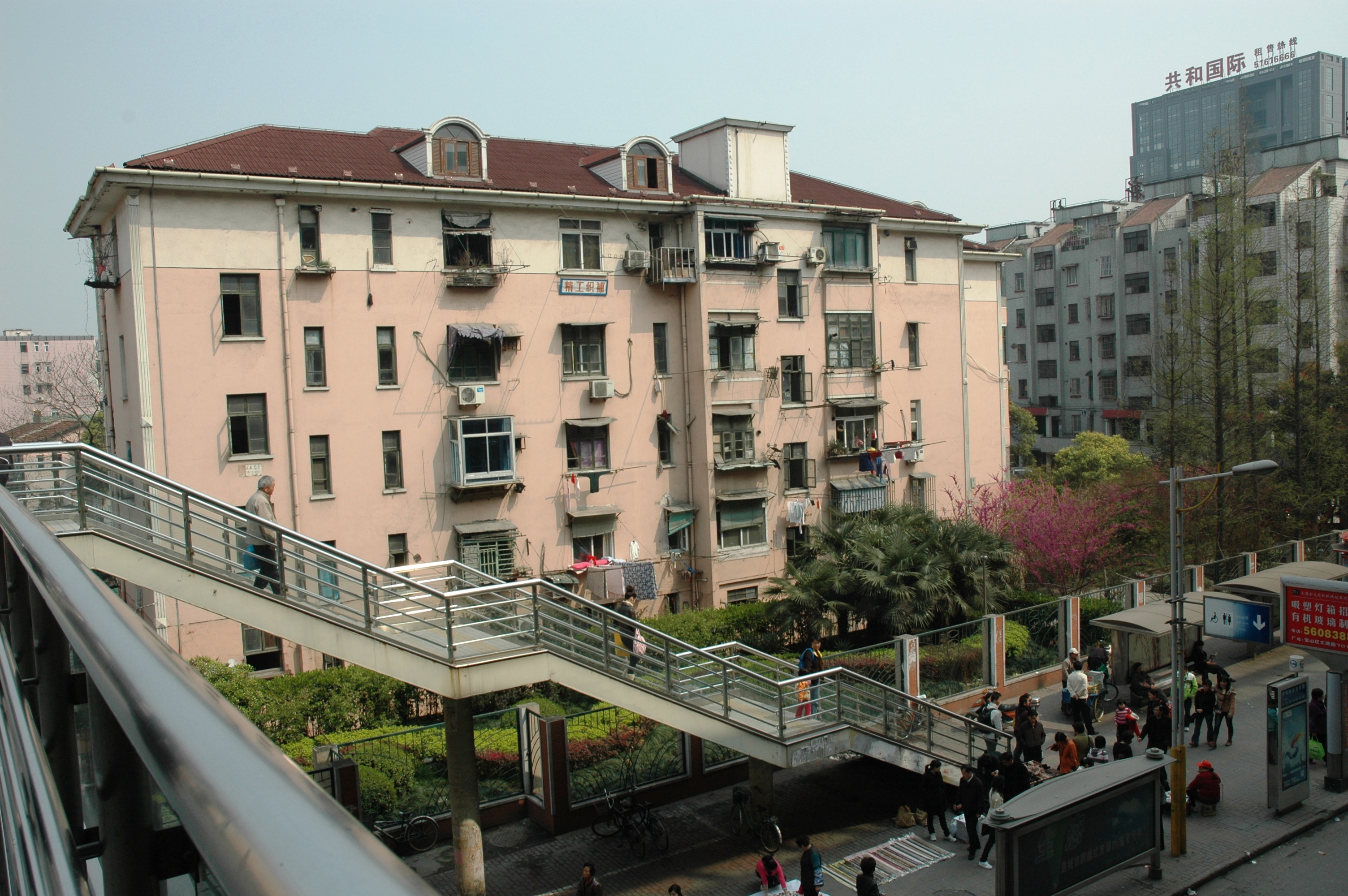
An "Old Public House" in Pengpu Xincun, Shanghai.

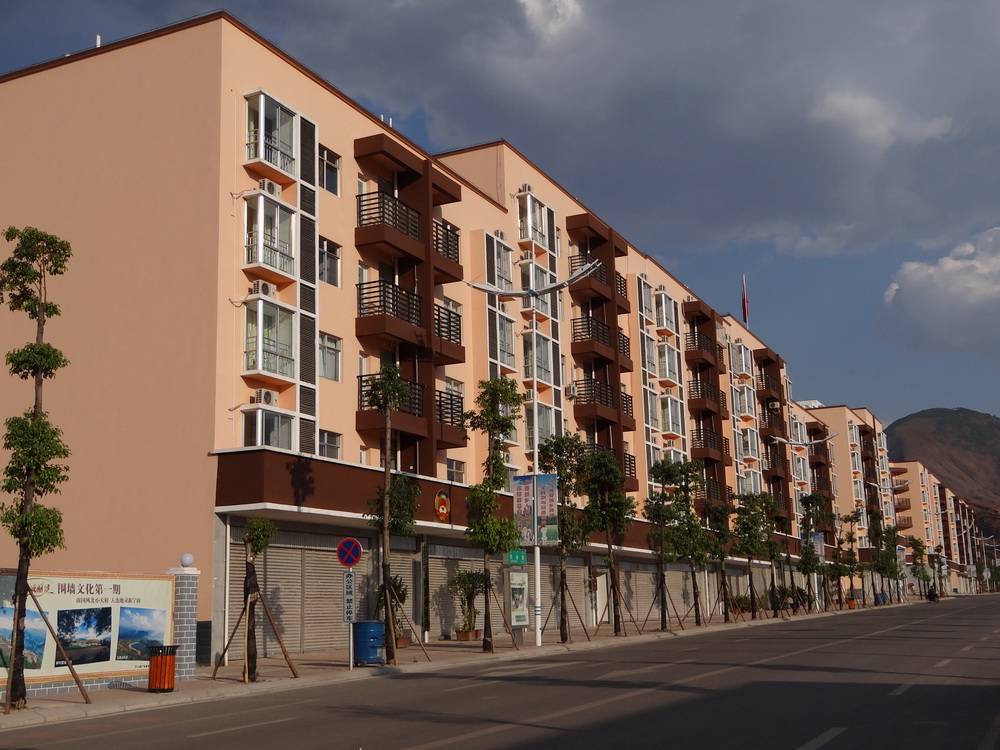
A low-rent house in Ningnan County, Sichuan.

The public-owned housing system was established when the Chinese Communist Party started a planned economy in the 1950s as part of its Great Leap Forward. The system was funded by the central government's budget and were administered and distributed by state-owned enterprises. The occupants of the public housing were usually the employees of the enterprises and their family, who were subject to pay rent at a very low price. The size and the type of room the households received were dependent on their job title or administrative level. The central government found it difficult to upkeep the public housing due to the low rent it received; the distribution policy that was intended to be "egalitarian" was actually corrupt.

The Chinese government commercialized the housing market after the reform and opening up started in 1978 by Deng Xiaoping. The public houses that were constructed before that the economic reforms were categorized as "Old Public Houses" (Chinese: 老公房). "Old Public Houses" were, in principle, not supposed to be privately sold, but the household could sell it after purchasing the ownership of the building (not the property), and such transactions were subject to be review by local housing authorities and the State-owned Assets Supervision and Administration Commission. However, an informal filing system and unclear policies resulted in problems of corruption and family dispute.

The concept of the low-cost rental housing can be traced to a 1998 policy statement, but did not truly take off until 2006 due to limited funding and administrative problems. The provision of more affordable housing is one of the key components of China's Twelfth Five-year Plan, which targets the construction of 36 million homes by 2015. That program's costs will be split between the private and public sector and are estimated at five trillion yuan by China International Capital Corporation.

=== Hong Kong ===
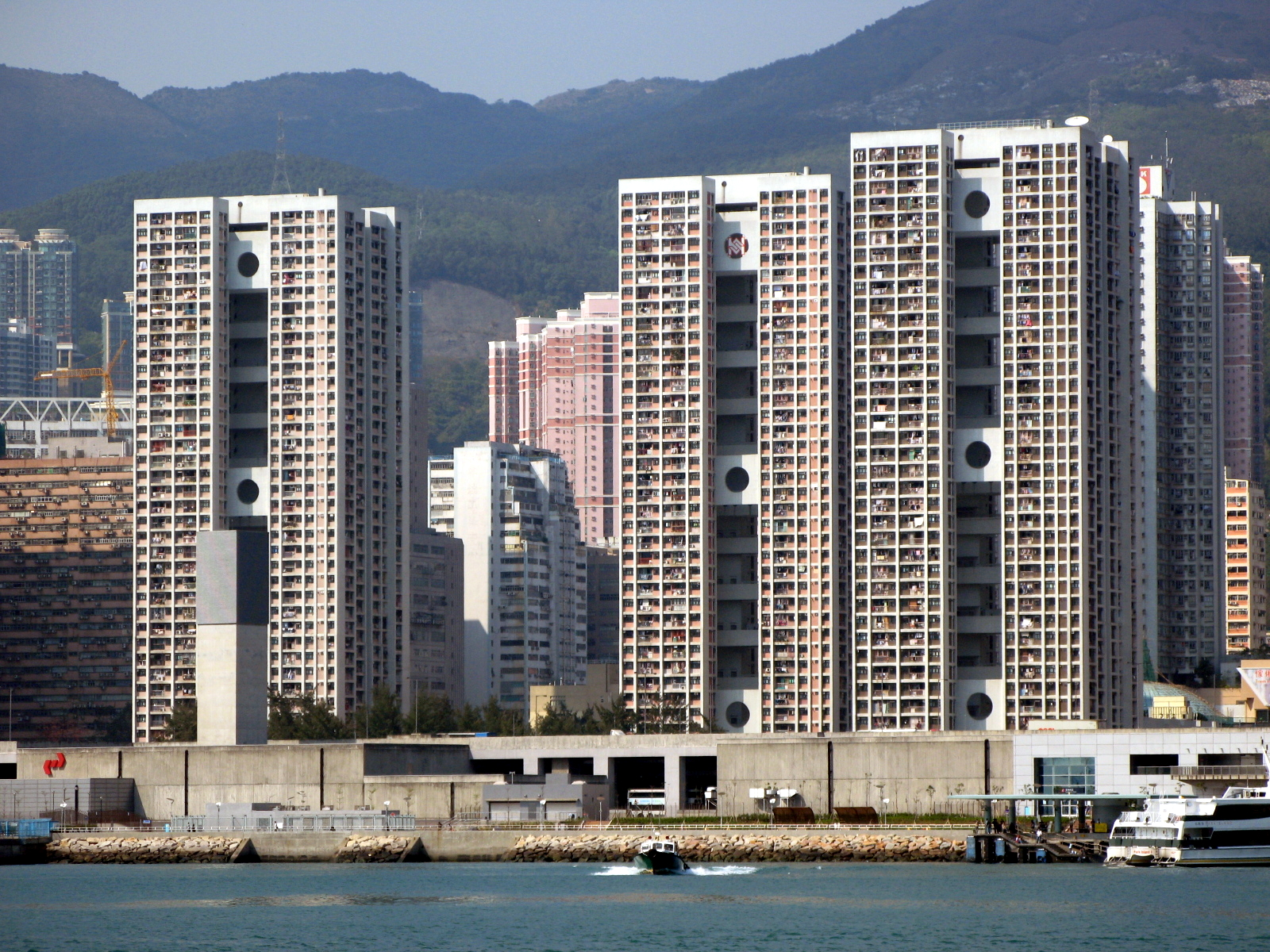
Clague Garden Estate, a public housing estate in Tsuen Wan, Hong Kong.

In Hong Kong, public housing is one of the major housing policies of the government. Nearly half of Hong Kong's 7.5 million population lives in public housing. The two main public housing providers are the Housing Authority and the Housing Society.

The most common types of public housing in Hong Kong are public rental housing (PRH) and subsidised sale flats produced under the Home Ownership Scheme (HOS). In 2016, approximately 31 per cent of Hong Kong households lived in PRH flats while 15 per cent resided in subsidised sale flats (of all types).

The origin of large-scale public housing in Hong Kong can be traced to the resettlement programme launched by the Hong Kong government in the 1950s in response to the increasing prevalence of squatter settlements, which emerged as a result of a great influx of refugees following the Communist revolution in China. The squatter villages were considered unsafe as they were susceptible to disastrous fires, including a 1953 blaze in Shek Kip Mei that rendered over 50,000 people homeless overnight.

Large-scale resettlement estates were built throughout the 1950s and 1960s. In 1973, the government of Sir Murray MacLehose launched the Ten-Year Housing Programme, which aimed to provide the entire population with "satisfactory housing" within a decade. The government also launched the Home Ownership Scheme (HOS) in 1976 to enable lower-income households to purchase flats.

Many public housing estates were built as part of new town development programmes. During the 1980s, most of the earliest resettlement estates (from the 1950s and early 1960s) were also rebuilt to modern standards. Public housing remains a key concern of the Hong Kong Government, which plans to construct some 330,000 units between 2022 and 2032.

=== India ===
86.6% of the Indian population lives in own houses. There are various public housing projects by both state and central governments in small scale.

Kerala has started an initiative of public housing called Life which is a part of their welfare mission, Nava Kerala Mission which aims to be one of the biggest public housing initiatives undertaken on a state level in India is schemed to build houses for an estimated 4.32 lakh (432,000) families in Kerala who do not own any land or houses. The handover of 3,23,894 houses were completed till date under the mission.

=== Indonesia ===
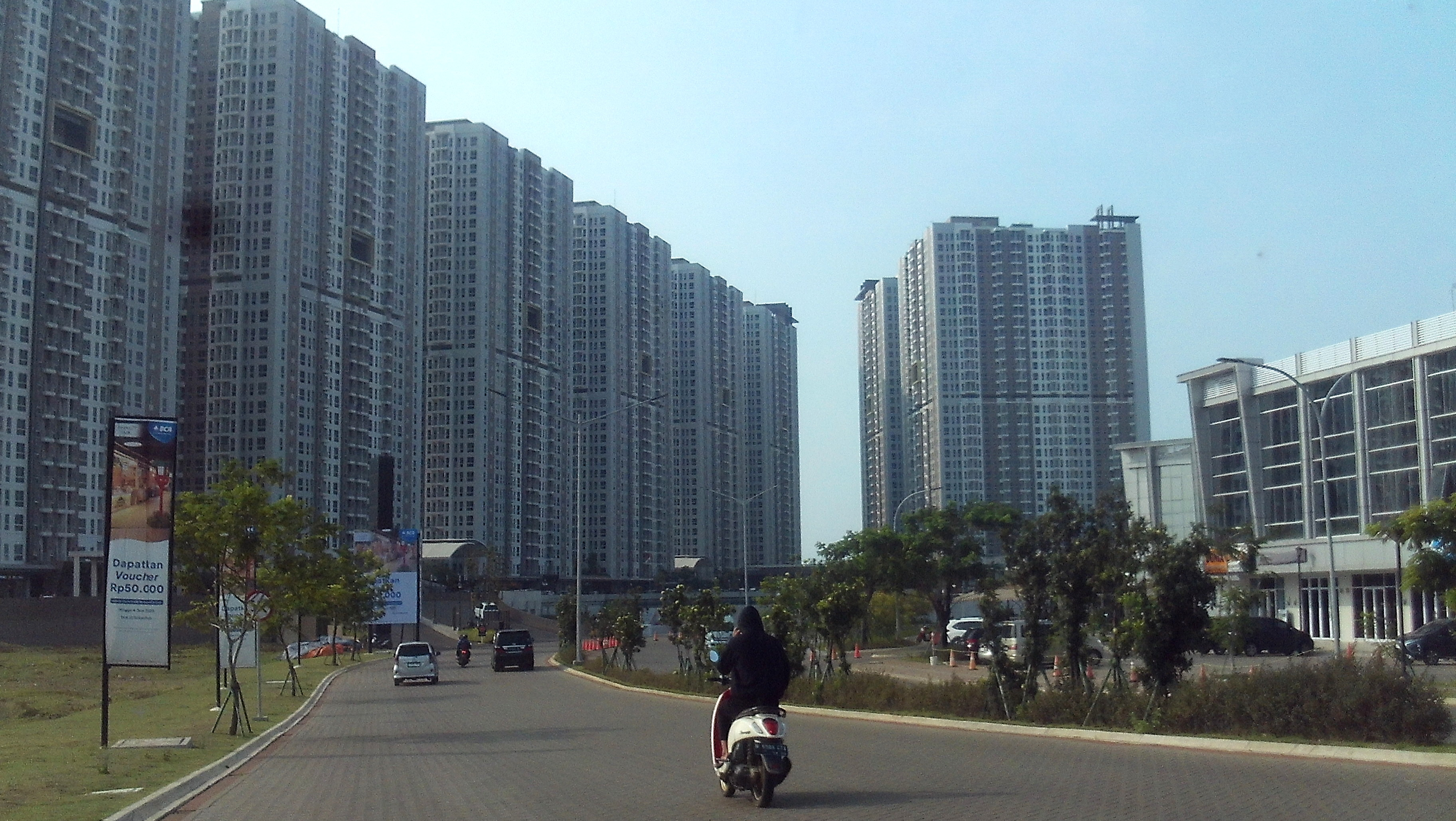
Apartment buildings in Tangerang, Indonesia.

Indonesia has undertaken One Million Houses program for low-income people. The program has been implementing since 2015 to achieve an ambitious target of building 10 million houses. The proportion of the housing is 70 percent for low-income people and 30 percent for non-low-income people. This program is a joint movement between the Central Government, regional governments, real estate developers and the community. The program is targeted to reach one million housing units annually. In 2015, about 700,000 homes were built, increasing to approximately 800,000 in 2016 and around 904,000 by the end of 2017.

=== Iran ===
There are 2 types of public housing in Iran, which are:

- Maskan mehr (Mehr housing)
- Maskan meli (National housing)

Iranian Minister of Road and Urban Development promised to deliver 4 millions apartment unit and flats and failed its aim. Registration scheme is closed for only males aged 23–45 without prior land ownership history.

=== Japan ===
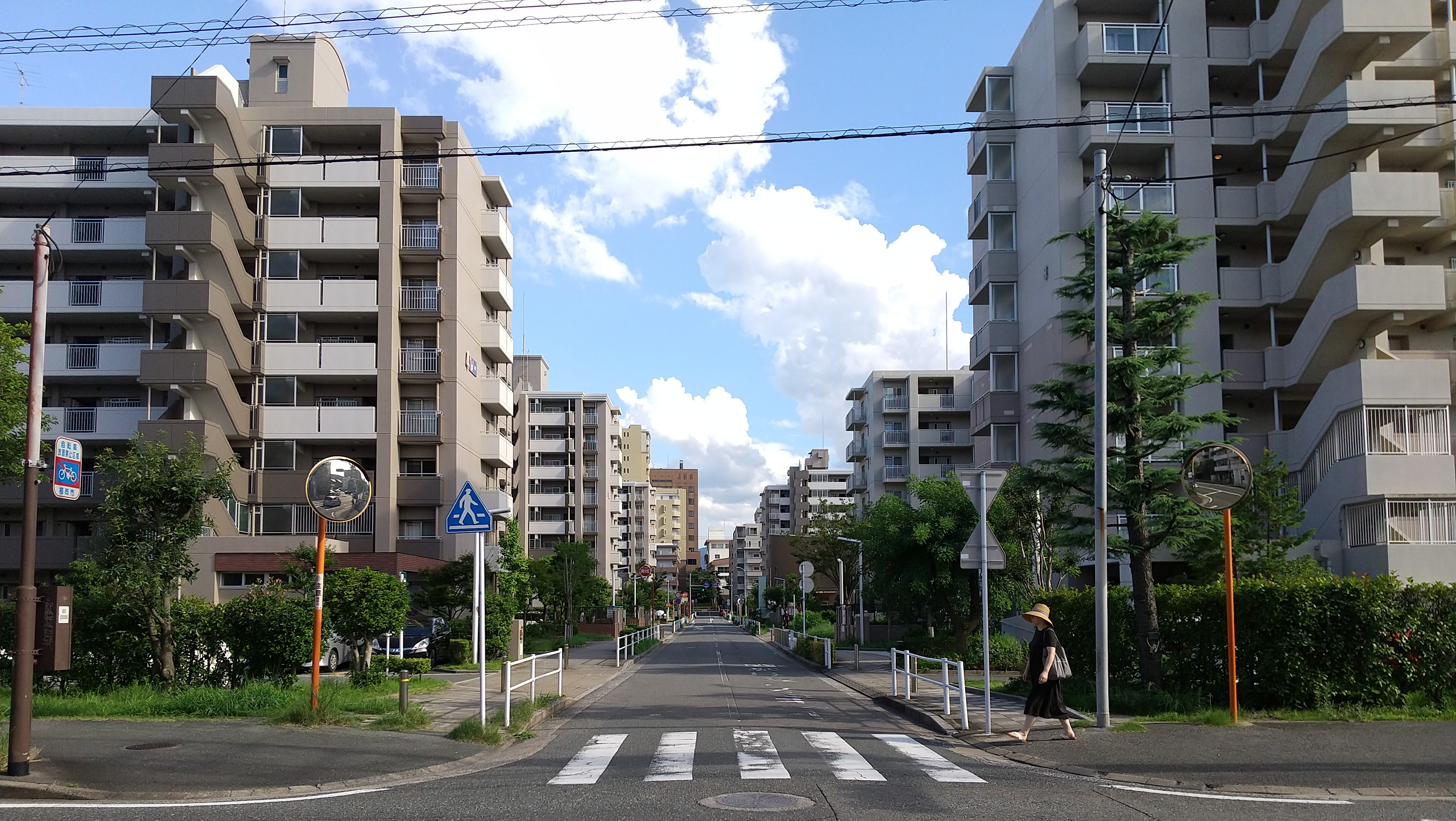
Public housing in Fukuoka, Japan.

Danchi (団地, literally "group land") is the Japanese word for a large cluster of apartment buildings or houses of a particular style and design, typically built as public housing by government authorities.

The Japan Housing Corporation (JHC), now known as the Urban Renaissance Agency (UR), was founded in 1955. During the 1950s, 1960s, and 1970s, the JHC built many danchi in suburban areas to offset the increasing housing demand during the post-World War II economic boom. It introduced the Japanese salaryman to a life around the nuclear family in contrast with the multi-generation homes before the war.

The rent payment for a danchi is much cheaper than that of an apartment or a mortgage, but for a public danchi the prospective tenant must usually participate in a lottery to be assigned an open apartment. Residents in UR danchi do not have to pay key money or contract renewal fees, making the residences cheaper than comparable housing even if the monthly rents are equivalent.

=== Singapore ===
In Singapore, the public housing program, particularly the planning and development of new public housing and the allocation of rental units and resale of existing ownership units, is managed by the Housing and Development Board. Day-to-day management of public housing communities has been delegated to Town Councils headed by the local members of parliament.

In 2018, 78.7% of Singaporean residents live in public residential developments, ranging from studio units to executive condominiums provided by the HDB, a major factor in Singapore having one of the highest home-ownership rates – over 90% of the resident population – in the world.

=== Taiwan ===
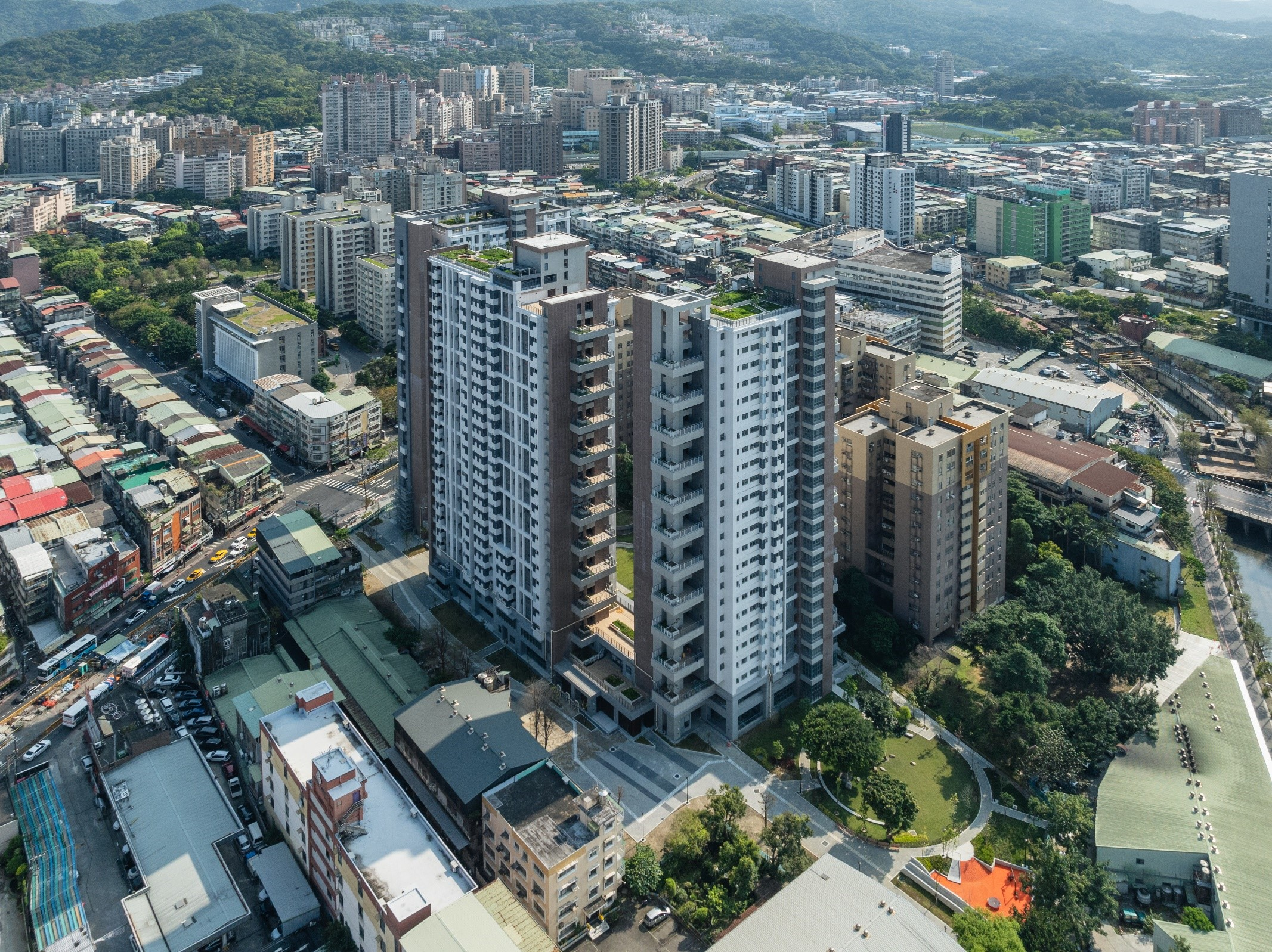
Social housing in Taiwan.

After Kuomintang's retreat to Taiwan, Taiwan experienced a population surge and, beginning in the 1980s, faced issues with ageing military dependents' village. To address these housing needs, the government constructed various types of public housing projects across the country. Starting in 1976, approximately 390,000 housing units were built, providing accommodation for around 1.58 million people. These projects were largely managed by specialised local government agencies, such as the National Housing Bureau. Taiwan’s public housing is generally categorized into three types:

- Rebuilt Military-Dependent Villages: These communities were primarily named with the suffix "New Village" (新村) (e.g., Matsu New Village) and aimed at replacing deteriorating military housing.
- Housing for Civil Servants and their Families: These communities served public employees and their families.
- Public Housing for Private Purchase: A limited number of units were made available for public purchase by private citizens.

In the late 1990s, due to an oversupply of housing units in the private market, the government decided to halt large-scale public housing projects, except for the continued redevelopment of military-dependent villages. This shift aimed to prevent issues like collusion between officials and developers, as well as competition with private developers.

Since the 2010s, with real estate speculation driving urban housing prices up, the government has focused on new types of public housing initiatives. These include affordable housing units for sale through public-private partnerships and social housing projects intended for rental, such as Taiwan’s "Social Housing" (社會住宅) initiative. However, there have been recurring concerns about potential collusion between government officials and developers in these new projects.

=== Vietnam ===
From the 1960s to the 1980s, Vietnam built Khu tập thể (KTT), socialist-modeled apartment blocks on the periphery of cities for civil servants, state-owned companies' workers, and military personnel. Market reforms in the late 1980s resulted in the partial privatization of the KTT, which were sold to low- and low-middle income populations. The KTT have since become dilapidated, due to a lack of municipal funding for repairs and maintenance, and been the target of demolition, displacement, and redevelopment for high-income populations.

In the 2010s, Vietnam has experienced a surge in property prices, with the affordable housing stock shrinking by 7% of the entire housing stock from 2014 to 2016, and apartment prices rising by 90% between 2017 and 2020. Developers are not interested in social housing projects since they are not profitable, even amidst rising demand from workers, so the Ministry of Construction requires funding to build 294,600 social housing units in the 2021 – 2025 period.

== Europe ==
=== European Union ===
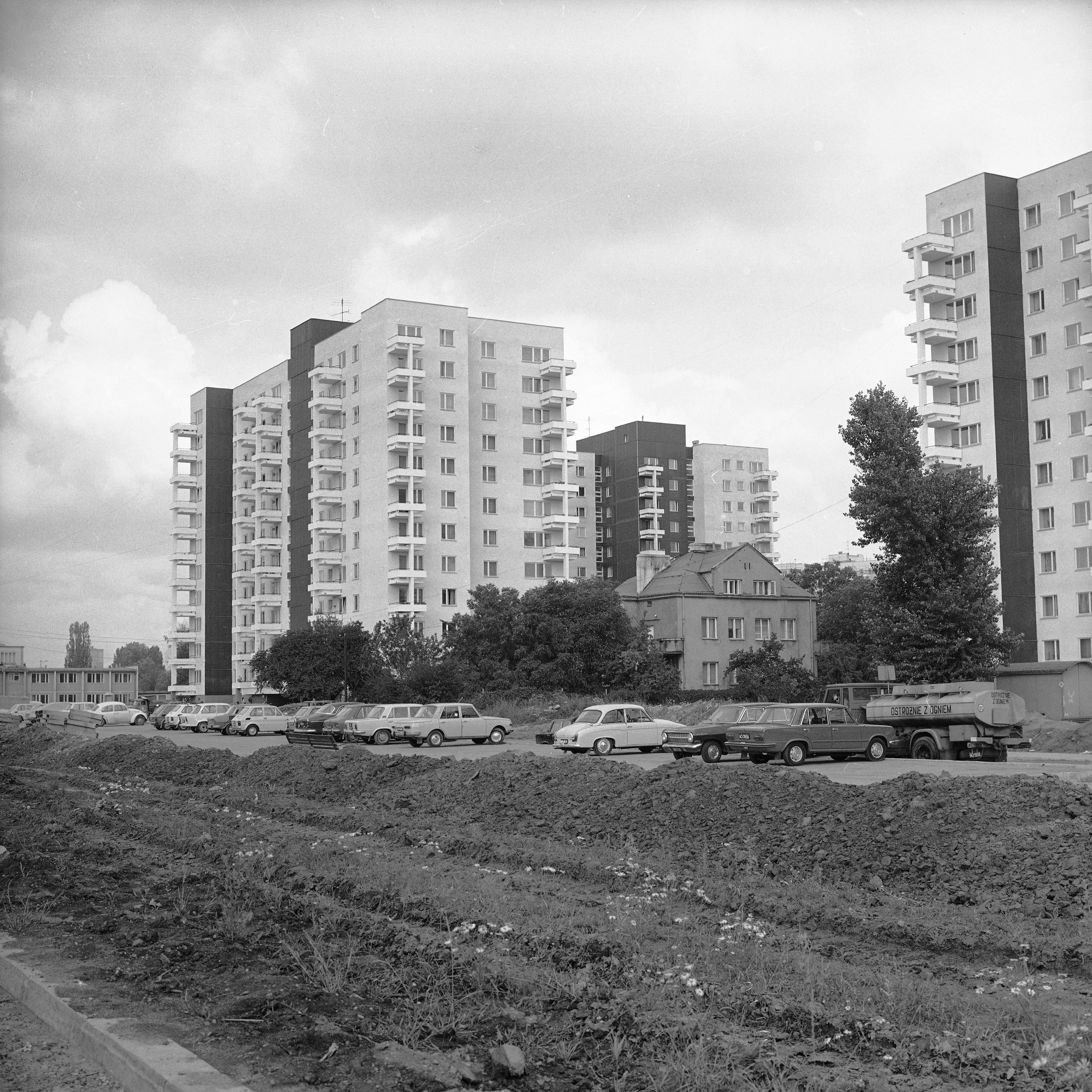
Brand new panel buildings in Warsaw, communist Poland, 1977.

According to a 2018 discussion paper of the European Commission, in 2015, 11.3% of the EU-population lived in households that spent 40% or more of their disposable income on housing.

In January 2019, the former European Commission President, Romano Prodi, declared that public investment in social infrastructure during the euro area crisis reached a 20-year low, with investment in social infrastructure in the EU estimated at €170 billion per year and the minimum infrastructure investment gap in these sectors estimated at €100 to €150 billion, representing a total gap of at least €1.5 trillion between 2018 and 2030.

Housing projects in Europe can be found in urban areas, as well as in suburban areas.

The EU was moving to support more affordable, energy-efficient and accessible housing with the financial contribution of the CEB and of the EIB through its European Fund for Strategic Investments. Public funding was planned to be directed primarily on affordable housing and secondly in the education and lifelong learning, health and long-term care sectors.

In Europe, there is a significant shortage of investment in social housing and a pressing need to renovate existing units. Annual investment in housing is predicted at €57 billion for new building and energy-efficiency modifications. The projections do not include the refugee situation caused by the Russian invasion of Ukraine.

=== Austria ===
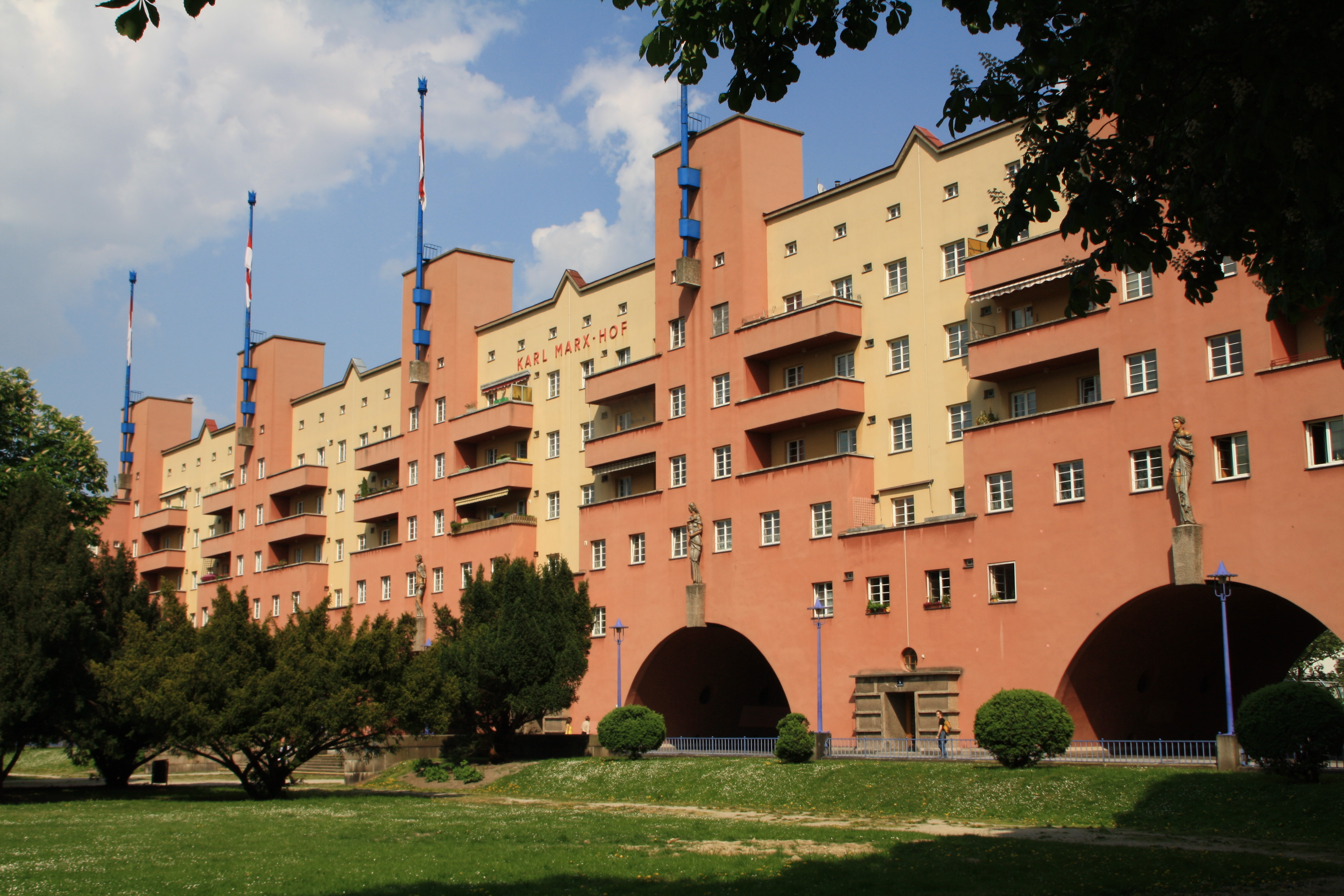
Karl Marx-Hof, a Gemeindebau constructed during the Red Vienna period in Döbling, Vienna (2009).

Public housing was an important issue right from the foundation of the Republic of German-Austria in 1918. The population was faced with a great deal of uncertainty particularly as regards food and fuel. This led to a significant number of less affluent people to move to the periphery of towns, often building makeshift homes to be closer to where they could grow food. They were called Siedler ('settlers'). As the political situation became stabilised with foundation of the First Austrian Republic in September 1919, the Siedler movement started creating formal organizations like the Austrian Association for Settlements and Small Gardens. The electoral victory of the Social Democratic Party of Austria in the elections for the Viennese Gemeinderat (city parliament) gave rise to Red Vienna. Part of their programme was the provision of decent homes for the Viennese working class who made up the core of their supporters. Hence the German word Gemeindebau (plural: Gemeindebauten) for "municipality building". In Austria, it refers to residential buildings erected by a municipality, usually to provide public housing. These have been an important part of the architecture and culture of Vienna since the 1920s.

=== Belgium ===
Social housing is a responsibility of the regions in Belgium. The regions do not directly own the houses, semi-private social housing corporations do. The government regulates and mostly finances these corporations. Below a certain income limit, people are eligible for social housing. Because there is a major shortage of social housing in Belgium, other priority conditions are often imposed, such as having children to care for. Social housing accounts for approximately 6.5% of the Belgian housing market. This is much lower than neighbouring countries such as the Netherlands and France. As of 2018, Flanders, Wallonia and Brussels are responsible for 280,687 social houses, 212,794 people are on the waiting list. For the people on the waiting list there are other possibilities such as subsidies and sociale rental agencies in Flanders.

=== Denmark ===
In Denmark, public housing is called alment boligbyggeri and is owned and administered by approximately 700 self-governing, democratic and non-profit organizations by and for the tenants themselves. Many of the public housing organizations in Denmark are rooted in the early history of the labor unions and currently forms about 20% of the total housing stock with about 7,500 departments countrywide. A membership of a housing organization is usually required to obtain a rental and they are granted with regard to length of membership.

Although the buildings are owned and administered by self-governing and economically independent organizations, the State of Denmark is strongly regulating public housing in the country. By law, the municipalities have access to 25% of the rentals, usually reserving them for the poor, the unemployed, the disabled or mentally ill or any other group dependent on social benefits from the municipality. Over the years, these regulations have created many 'vulnerable residential areas' within the country. Danish public housing has never had any income restrictions, but in recent years new state regulations has made it mandatory for several of them to favor fully employed renters and disfavor unemployed or part-time employed people. This is a relatively new effort by the state to counter the ghettoisation, which is now an officially recognized problem countrywide.

As in Sweden, state and municipal policies carried out throughout the first decade of the 21st century, has led to an increased privatization of public housing. In many areas, residents have been offered to buy their own flats, thereby effectively changing the status of the property. The privatization of public housing was initiated as part of an ideological program by the right wing governments of the early 21st century and was launched a few years after the closure of the former Ministry of Housing Affairs in 2001. The former ministry was re-opened as Ministry of Housing, Urban and Rural Affairs in October 2011, when a new coalition government led by social-democrats was formed.

=== Finland ===
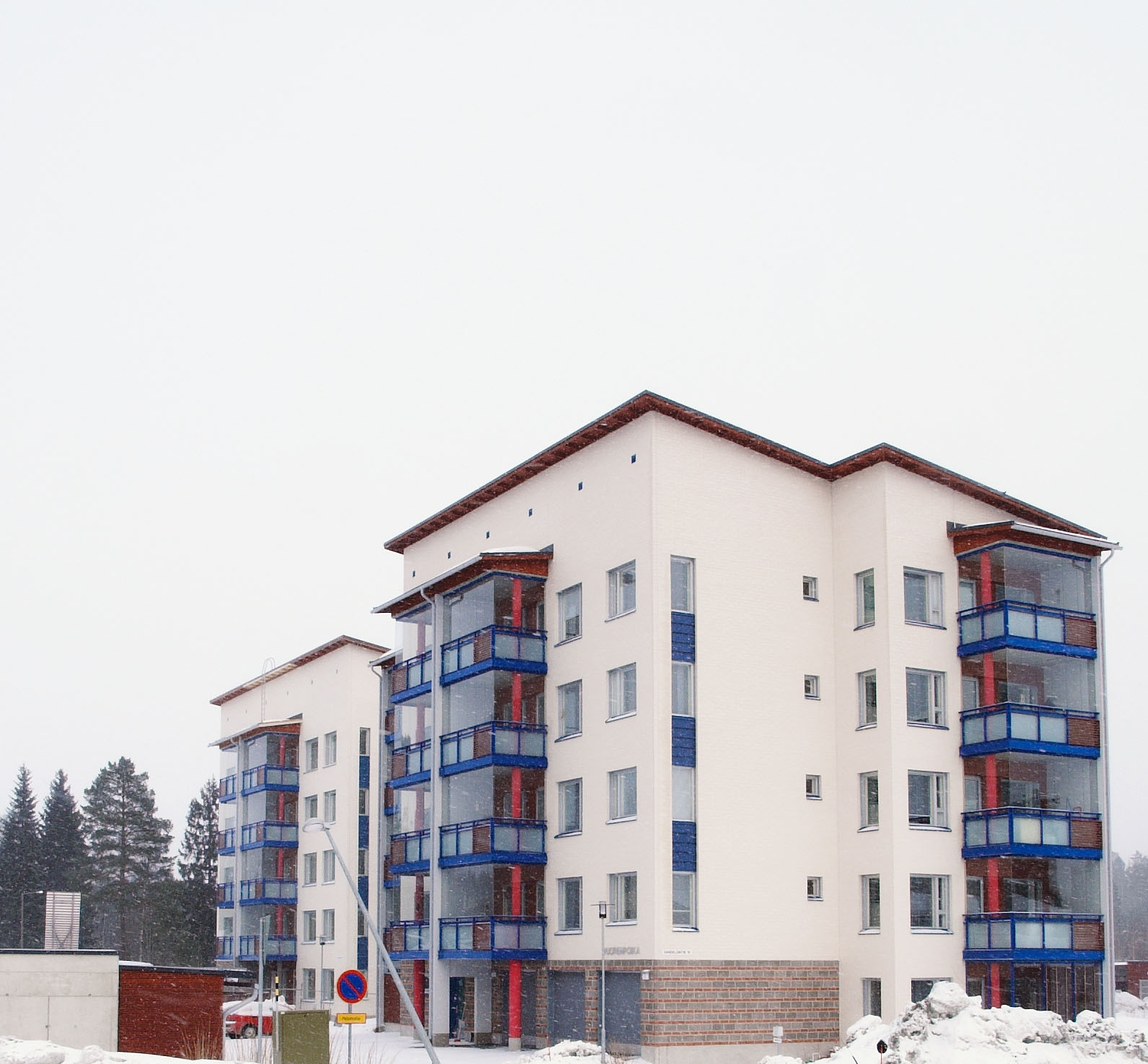
A public housing apartment building at the Sandelsinkatu street in Siilinjärvi, Finland.

The right to housing is guaranteed in the Finnish constitution, and public housing in Finland is largely funded through loans which are subsidized and guaranteed by the government. Roughly one third of Finland's housing stock has been built this way. Rents for public housing apartments in Finland are typically significantly lower than market-rate housing. Eligibility to live in public housing in Finland is based on a need-based evaluation, and those with very low incomes and those who are experiencing homelessness are given priority.

The earliest public housing project in Finland was in Helsinki. In 1909, four wooden houses designed by the architect A. Nyberg were built on Kirstinkuja (formerly Kristiinankatu) for the city's workers. The residents were mainly working-class families with several children. The apartments had an average of five people per room, sometimes up to eight. The tiny apartments were equipped with running water, a pantry and an attic cupboard. Every apartment had its own toilet in the cellar. Electric lighting was installed in 1918.

The homes and lives of worker families in Helsinki from 1909 to 1985 are presented in a museum near the Linnanmäki amusement park.

In 2008, Helsinki launched its Housing First policy, with the goal of ending homelessness by prioritizing unconditional housing. With municipal, state, and NGO support, and coupled with health and medical services, the program reduced homelessness by 35% between 2008 and 2019.

=== France ===
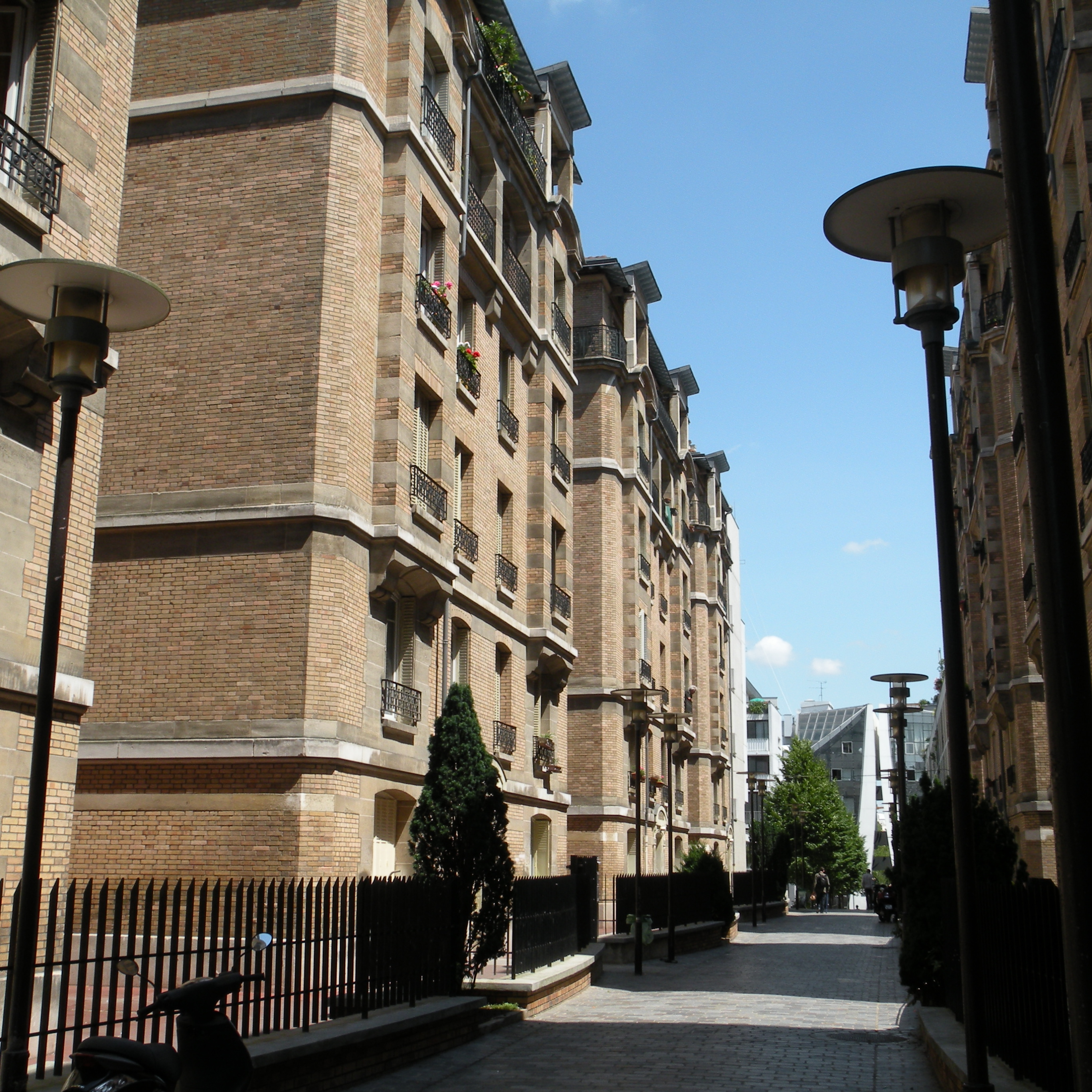
Public housing of the rue Jean Fautrier in the 13th arrondissement of Paris.

After World War II, the population increased at a rate previously unknown, the rural exodus increased, while war damage had reduced the number of houses in many cities. Rental prices dramatically rose, and the government made a law in 1948 to block them, effectively ending the economic benefits of housing investment. Rents were gradually deregulated until debate in the 1980s led to the current rental law of 1989 theoretically balancing landlord and tenant relations. However, there was a major homelessness crisis in the winter of 1953–4 and the necessary laws were gradually mobilized producing high levels of construction almost continuously from the 1960s. Social landlords were a major source of expertise as well as construction actors with links to national and local bodies. The construction industry was at the time inadequate so political support was needed.

It is incorrect to refer to French social housing as public housing. The origins of French social housing lie in the private sector, with the first State aid provided to limited-profit companies by the loi Siegfried in 1894. The originally socialist idea was promoted by some French employers in the 2nd half of the 19th century. Public housing companies followed before World War I. There are still different social housing movements, public, private and some cooperative. Social landlord organizations all have similar regulation and similar access to government loans but there are significant differences.

The government launched a series of major construction plans, including the creation of new towns (villes nouvelles) and new suburbs with HLM (Habitation à Loyer Modéré, "low-rent housing"). The state had the funds and the legal means to acquire the land and could provide some advantages to the companies that then built its huge housing complexes of hundreds of apartments. Quality was also effectively regulated, resulting in decent or even top quality housing for the standard of the 1950s and 1960s. The construction of HLMs were subject to much political debate. Much smaller developments are now the norm. This housing is now generally referred to as l'habitat social, a slightly wider sphere than just housing.

France still retains this system, a recent law making it an obligation for every town to have at least 20% HLM. Nowadays HLM represents roughly half of the rental market (46% in 2006). Social housing is not all for disadvantaged people who are just one of the target groups. Part of the funding can be provided by employer-employee groups to provide housing for local employees. The 20% target can include intermediate housing for better off groups, although its object is to produce social mix. Gentrification and the very basis of social housing allocation are divisive issues as well as the extent of local control of housing. This housing has always been a multi-actor activity and recent local government reorganization continues to change the political landscape.

While they succeeded in giving lower-income families a place to live in the drive to provide popular housing, this system also led to the creation of suburban ghettos, with a problem of disrepair. There has been a long-term problem of gradual impoverishment of social tenants There, deprived strata of the population, mostly of immigrant origin and suffering massive under-employment, might in the past have been left to simmer away from the more affluent urban centres, sometimes becoming rife with social tensions and violence. This affects a minority of social housing but has a high profile and still produces serious tension.

Tackling this problem at its roots is all but simple, and social mix policies can break up populations seen as difficult by redevelopment. This has not had the hoped for results. It has also been sought to resolve the problem of access to the system by disadvantaged people by a new system where certain groups can apply to court to be housed if refused, the "right to housing". This tends to intensify the controversy over social housing allocation, who should be housed. The French tradition of 'universal' social housing allocation – housing for everyone is called into question by EU competition law restricting subsidy except for the disadvantaged. In any event, the system is certainly effective in producing construction, although not with the excesses seen in the recent credit crunch elsewhere.

According to a study by the Banque des Territoires in 2025, building new or renovated social housing seems impossible given the budgetary equation in France.

=== Germany ===
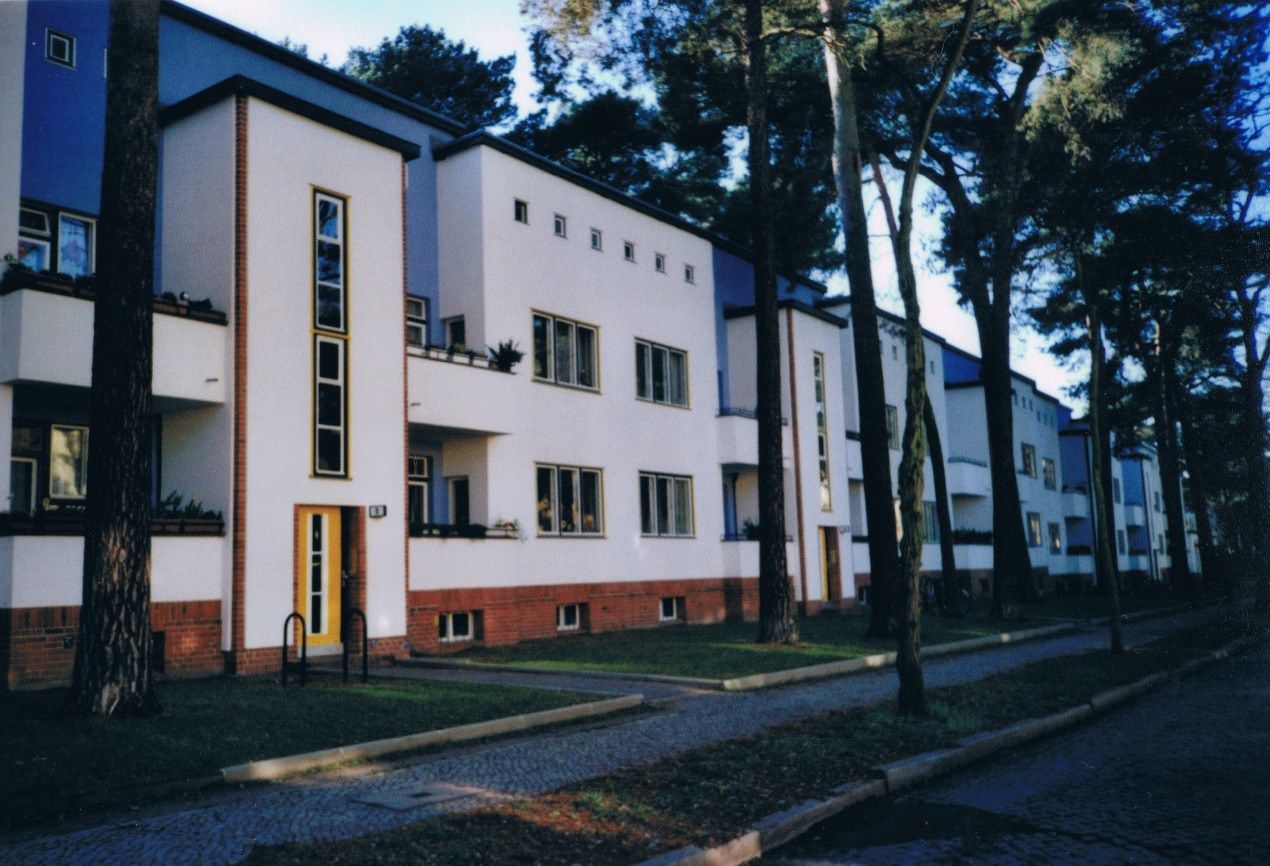
Bruno Taut, Uncle Tom's Cabin Estate, Wilskistrasse, Berlin.

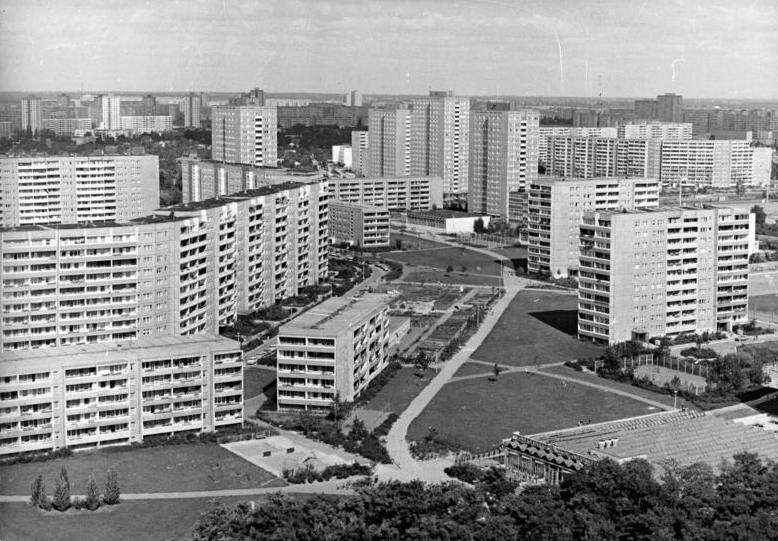
Berlin-Marzahn, the largest East German Neubaugebiet ("New development area"), 1987.

Between 1925 and 1930, Germany was the site of innovative and extensive municipal public housing projects, mostly in Berlin, Hamburg, Cologne and Frankfurt. These housing estates (Siedlungen), were made necessary by the dreadful living conditions of pre-war urban tenements. The 1919 Weimar Constitution in Article 155 stated that the state would "promote the object of assuring to every German a healthful habitation", but few homes were built until the economy stabilised in 1925.

The new German housing estates were low-rise, no more than five stories, and in suburban settings. Residents were provided access to light, air, and sun. The size, shape, orientation and architectural style of Germany's public housing were informed by the recent experience of the Viennese, the Dutch, the anti-urban Garden City Movement in Britain, the new industrialized mass-production and pre-fabrication building techniques, the novel use of steel and glass, and by the progressive-liberal policies of the Social Democrats.

In 1930 in the industrial city of Dessau, the Laubenganghäuser ('Houses with Balcony Access') were designed by Bauhaus director Hannes Meyer for a housing cooperative that wanted apartments it could let for no more than a quarter of the occupant's income. Working on a tight budget inspired money and space saving innovations, such as using balcony walkways for access to the apartments rather than having internal corridors and clever use of the internal space in the 47 m^{2} (510 sq ft) apartments.

Architects Martin Wagner, Bruno Taut and others built the Berlin Modernism Housing Estates, now a World Heritage Site, consisting of thousands of homes built in and around Berlin, including the Horseshoe Estate (named for its shape), and Uncle Tom's Cabin estate (named after a local restaurant). In Frankfurt the architect Ernst May lead the New Frankfurt public housing project, in which over 12,000 apartments were built 1925–1930. May ran his own sizable research facility to investigate, for instance, air-flow in various floorplan configurations, construction techniques, etc. The Austrian architect Margarete Schütte-Lihotzky applied the principles of Taylorism to the kitchen workspace and developed the Frankfurt kitchen while working for Ernst May.

Beyond technical research, May also published two magazines and embarked on a significant public-relations project, with films and classes and public exhibitions, to make Neues Bauen acceptable to the public. In the late 1920s, the principles of equal access to Licht, Luft und Sonne ('light, air and sun') and the social effects of a state-guaranteed Existenzminimum ("minimum subsistence level") became a matter of lively popular debate all over Germany. One indirect result of this publicity was the American housing movement: a young Catherine Bauer attended one of May's conferences in 1930, and wrote her influential book Modern Housing (1934) based on research done in Frankfurt and with Dutch architect JJP Oud.

Increasing pressure from the rising Nazis brought this era to an end in 1933. A majority of the German public housing experts had social democrat or communist sympathies and were forced out of the country.

In East Germany, the communist administration built monolithic Plattenbau apartment blocks and estates. Most new residential buildings from the 1960s onward were built in this style, as it was a quick and relatively cheap way to address the country's severe housing shortage, which had been caused by wartime bombing raids and the large influx of German refugees from further east.

Today, much social housing in Germany is operated by local housing companies (kommunale Wohnungsunternehmen) providing both market rent and social rent properties. Such companies are ultimately owned by the local authority but they are equipped with operational independence and access to capital markets, resembling the housing association model rather than the council housing model.

Designated social rent properties are only available to individuals presenting a Housing Entitlement Certificate (Wohnberechtigungsschein, or WBS) issued by their local authority.

=== Hungary ===
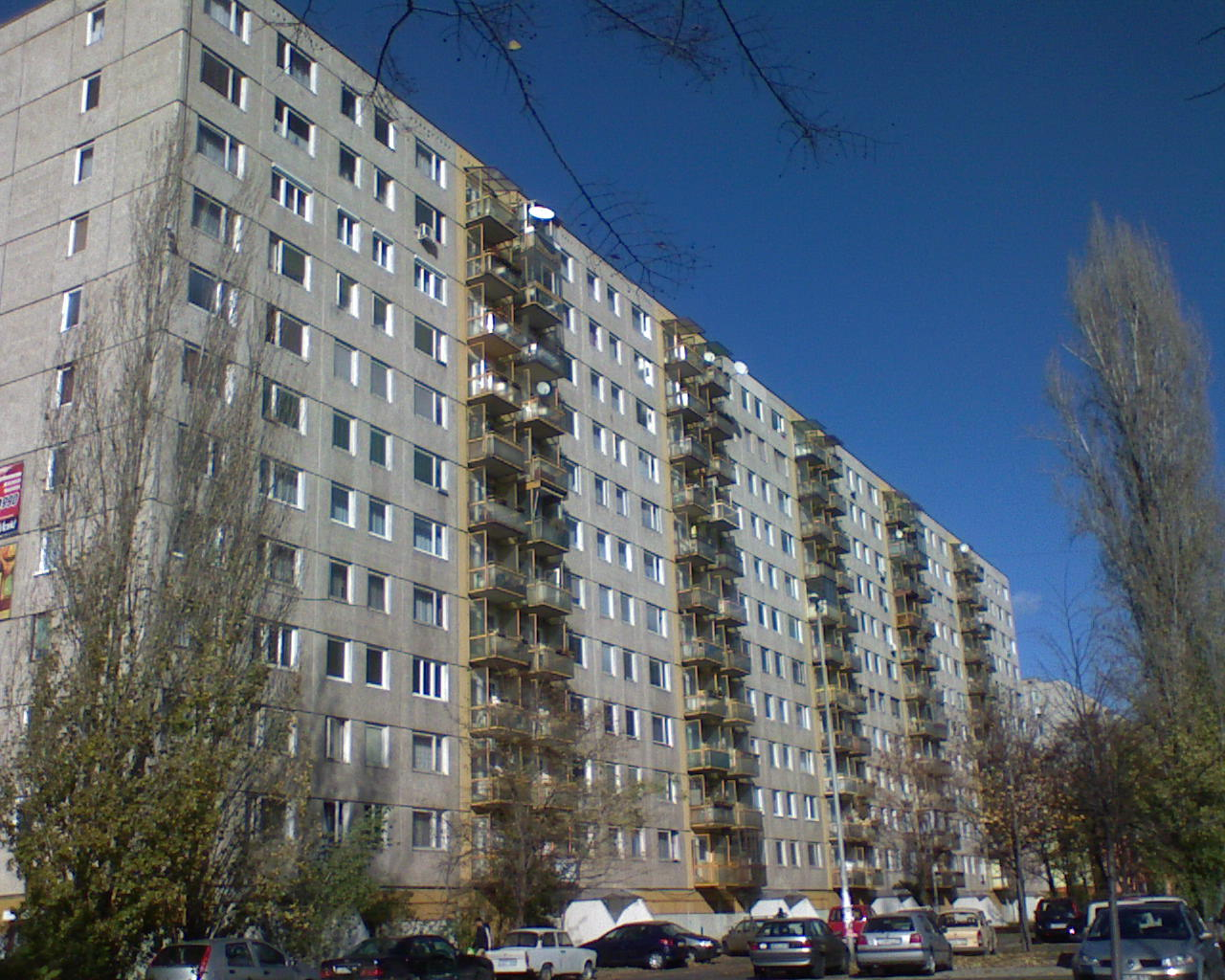
Panelház in Budapest-Kispest.

Panelház (short form: panel) is the name of a type of block of flats (panel buildings) in Hungary. It was the main housing type built in the Socialist era. From 1959 to 1990 788,000 panel flats were built in Hungary. About 2 million people, about one fifth of the country's total population, live in these flats. The Hungarian government and local municipalities began a renovation program during the 2000s. In the program they have insulated these buildings, replaced the old doors and windows with multi-layer thermo glass, renewed the heating system and colored the buildings in a more pleasant way.

=== Ireland ===
In Ireland, public housing and halting sites (sites used by semi-nomadic Traveller communities) have been built by local authorities and are known as Local Authority Accommodation. Dublin Corporation and the former Dublin County Council provided the lion's share of Irish local authority housing, with County Longford having the largest ratio of local authority to private housing in the state.

Large-scale social housing was erected in the 1930s and 1960s, with both cases following slum clearance. Critics argue that the National Building Agency focused too much on housing delivery, and failed to deliver retail and other services.

The government has promoted tenant purchase on favourable terms, and many former social housing areas are now completely or almost completely privately owned. Housing associations, or independent, nonprofit charities, now play a significant role in rental social housing provision. As the Irish state's ability to borrow is diminished government policy favours an increased role for private financing of housing associations instead of capital grants for local authorities. Ireland currently faces a severe shortage of social and council housing, and is experiencing a housing and homelessness crisis.

=== Netherlands ===
In the Netherlands, the rent for the cheaper rental homes is kept low through governmental oversight and regulation. These types of homes are known as sociale huurwoningen.

In practice this is accomplished by non-profit private housing foundations or associations (toegelaten instellingen). Due to frequent mergers the number of these organizations dropped to around 430 by 2009. They manage 2.4 million dwellings. The majority of low-rent apartments in the Netherlands are owned by such organisations. Since the policy changed in 1995 the social housing organizations have become financially independent, focusing on their role as social entrepreneurs. In most Dutch municipalities there came to exist a certain minimum capacity of social housing throughout the last decades. In many cities such as Amsterdam, The Hague, Rotterdam and Utrecht the percentage of social housing approaches or even passes 50 percent. The public (financial) supervision is done by the central fund for housing (Centraal Fonds Volkshuisvesting).

The Dutch housing policy is based on a concept of universal access to affordable housing for all and the prevention of segregation. As of 2020, the Dutch government is attempting to build 10,000 housing units for the homeless, by 2022. There is a Homeownership Guarantee Fund to support the National Mortgage Guarantee, which provides access to finance and purchase owner-occupied housing.

=== Romania ===
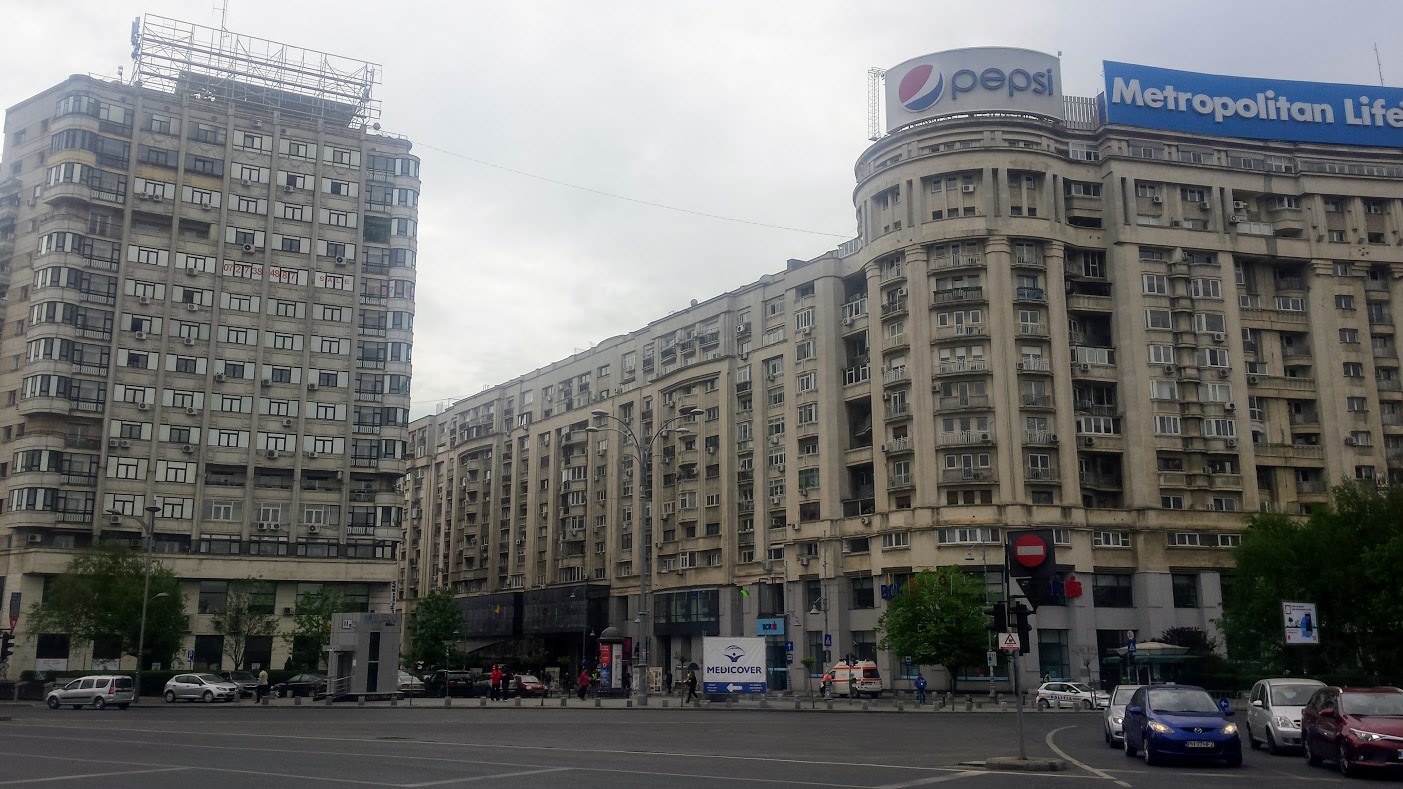
Government built housing in Bucharest, Romania.

The skyline of many Romanian cities became dominated by standardized apartment blocks under the former communist government's policy of tower bloc construction. Beginning in 1974, systematization consisted largely of the demolition and reconstruction of existing villages, towns, and cities, in whole or in part, with the stated goal of turning Romania into a "multilaterally developed socialist society". In 2012, 2.7 million flats date from the communist period, accounting for 37% of total housing in Romania and for about 70% in cities and towns. Subsequent to post-communist privatization, the homeownership rate in this form of housing reached of 99.9%. The new Home Owner Associations (HOAs) were challenged internally by the cumulative effect of defaulting contributions, lack of affordability and the established practice of casual resident service in HOAs, which often triggered mismanagement. On the other hand, HOAs were challenged from outside by non-effective mechanisms to address their internal problems, such as non-existent fast court procedures against defaulting, poor financial assistance to socially disadvantaged households and a private sector unprepared to take on condominium management.

=== Spain ===
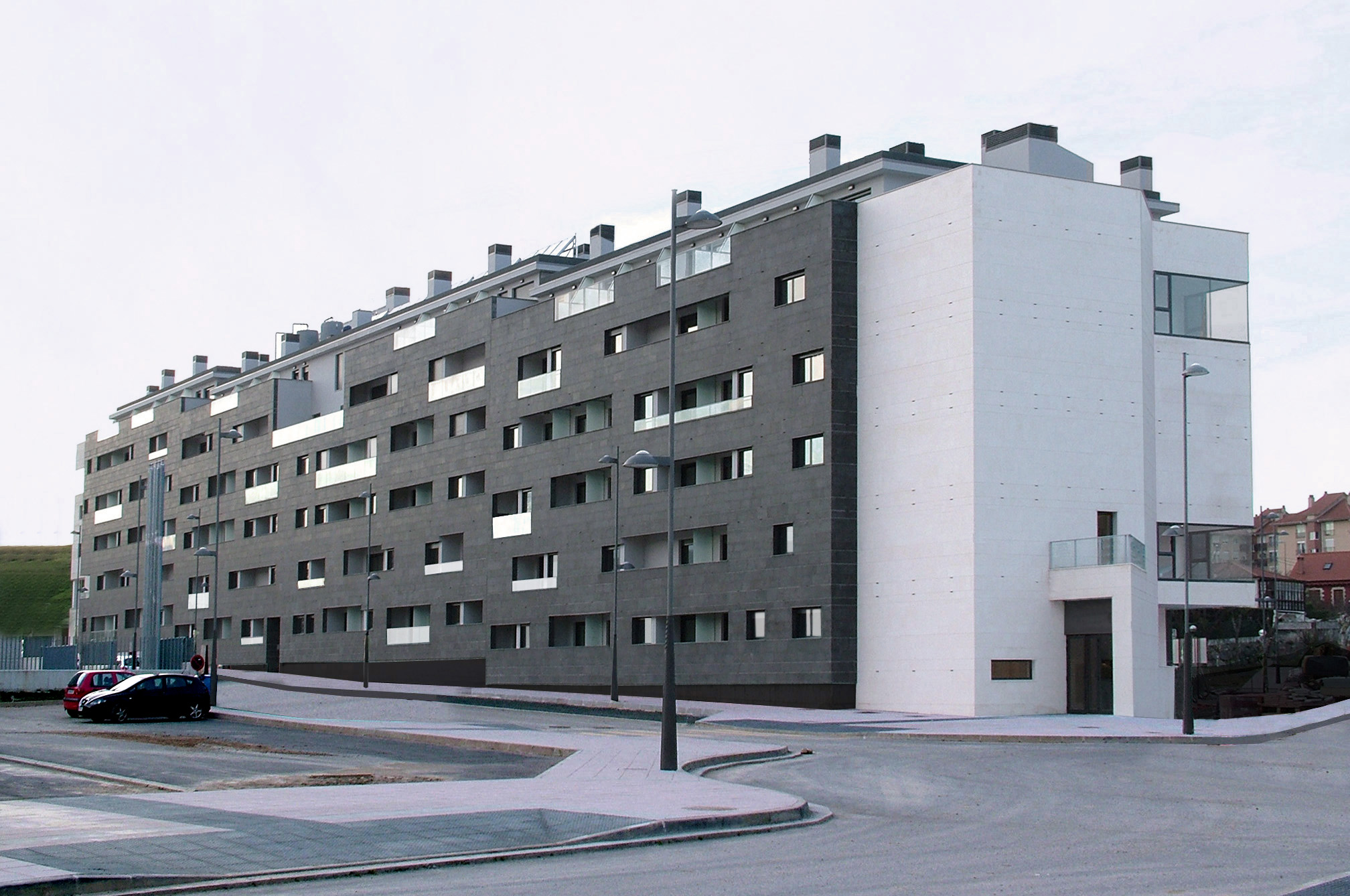
Public housing, winner of an environmental design award, in El Astillero, Cantabria, Spain.

Spaniards' reluctance to home rental, and government spending cuts in the 1980s, reduced rented public housing in Spain to a minimum. Rented public houses were relatively common in the Franco era (1939–75). With the advent of democracy and the 1978 Constitution, the right to housing became guaranteed, and the management of social housing depended mostly on the autonomous regions. This resulted in a wide variety of laws, which make the issue highly dependent on the region.

In spite of this, a scheme for viviendas de protección oficial (VPO) has been widely used, consisting of local councils allowing for building contractors and developers to build in public sites or with public loans on condition that a certain percentage of apartments remain subsidized and under control of the local authorities. This is known as VPO de promoción privada ('privately developed'), as opposed to the VPO de promoción pública ('publicly developed'), in which the whole property is owned and managed by a government authority. Publicly developed housing is made almost exclusively for owner-occupation, not rent, and made up 11% of the housing stock in 2010.

A new plan (Plan estatal español de vivienda y rehabilitación para el período 2009–2012) was put forward by the Rodríguez Zapatero government, aiming to make near a million homes available for public housing, relying both on new construction and refurbishment of unused houses.

Major parts of Spanish cities have been expanded in the last 20 years with projects heavily dependent on public and collective housing projects, which has stressed its importance inside the main architecture schools, that have answered the challenge with the development of several specialized courses and formation plans, such as the Madrid UPM – ETH Zurich combined MCH Master in Collective Housing.

=== Sweden ===
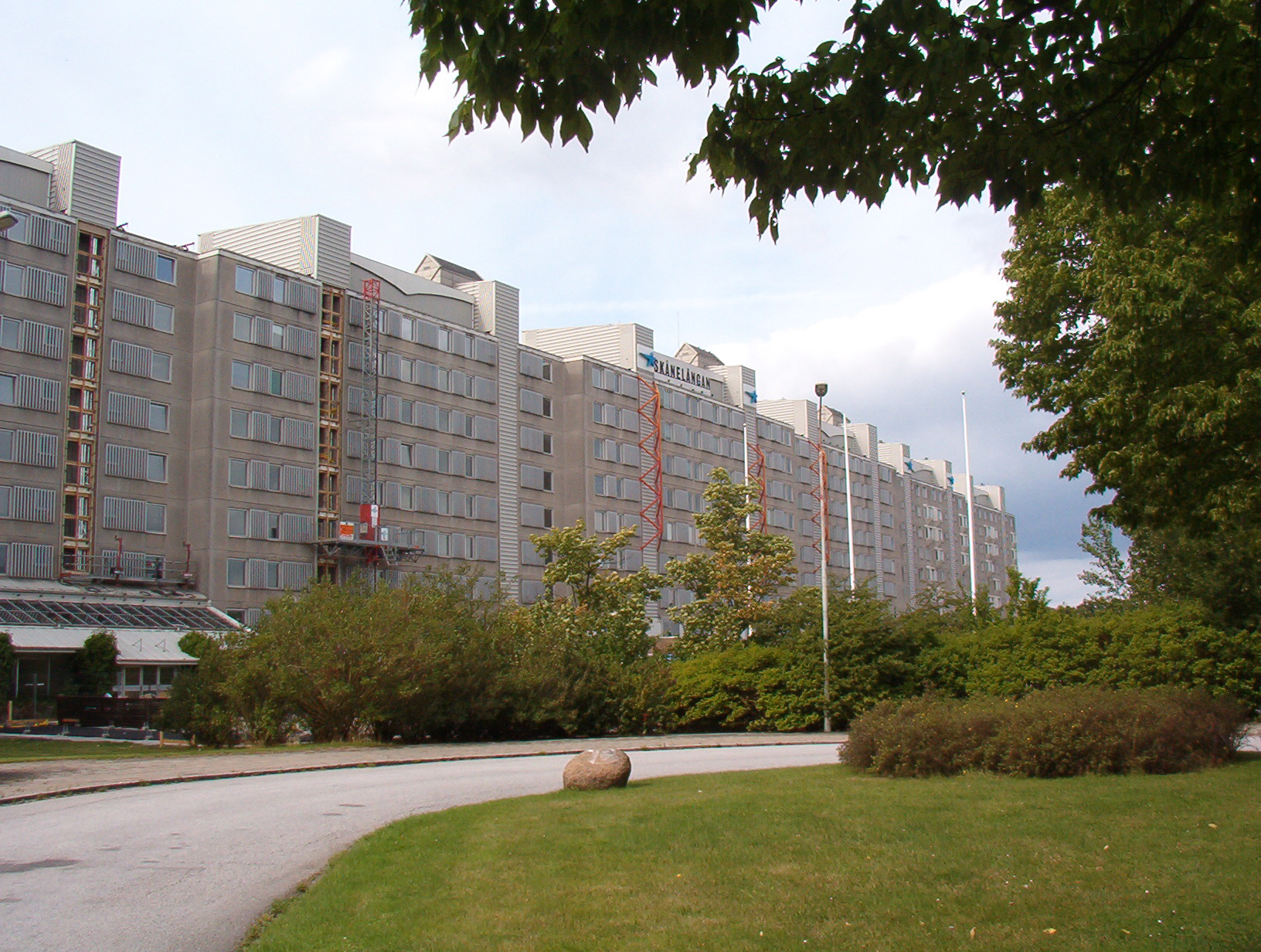
Tower block buildings in Rosengård, Malmö.

Swedish public housing, handled by allmännyttiga bostadsföretag (public-good housing companies), consists mainly apartments owned by the local council. Unlike many other countries, Swedish public housing has never had any income restrictions. Instead, for large parts of the period between 1920 and 1990 (for instance, during the era of Million Programme), public housing companies such as Svenska Bostäder were the major operators in housing projects as well as in projects aiming to acquire old and worn down buildings. Although not carrying out housebuilding nor acquisition projects in recent times, the policies lead to a ubiquitous presence of publicly owned buildings throughout the cities of Sweden, including attractive urban areas, with a rather wide range of income among the tenants.

New regulations, implemented in the first decade of the 21st century, have enabled tenants in public housing to buy their buildings, which has led to a significant loss of public housing in attractive urban areas.

=== Slovakia and Czechia ===
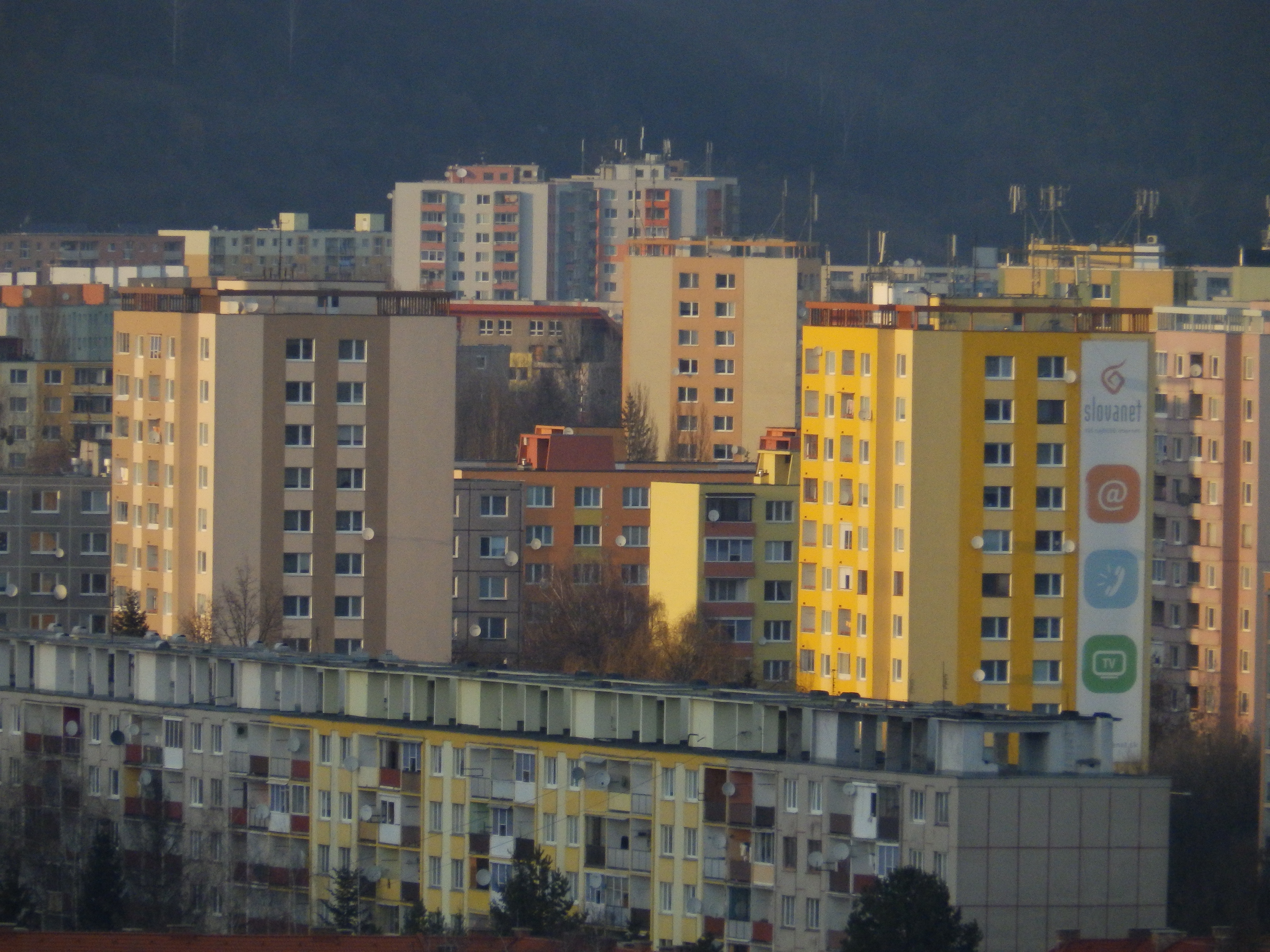
Sídlisko III in Prešov, Slovakia.

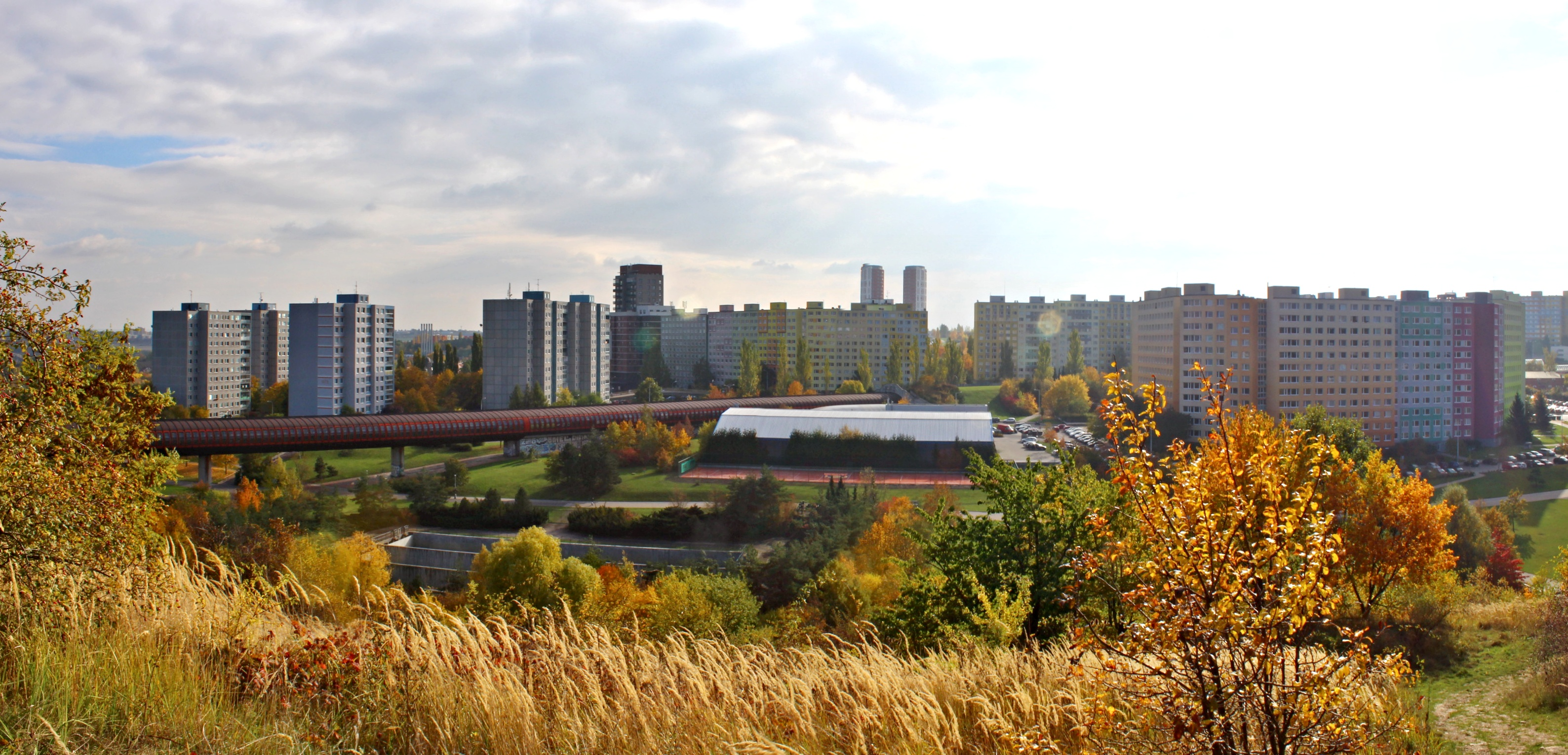
Prefab housing in Lužiny, Prague, Czechia.

Forms of housing projects may vary in Slovakia. In the former Czechoslovakia (now Czech Republic and Slovakia) during the communist era, a construction of large housing estates (Slovak: sídlisko, Czech: sídliště) was an important part of building plans in the former Czechoslovakia. The government wanted to provide large quantities of fast and affordable housing and to slash costs by employing uniform designs over the whole country. They also sought to foster a "collectivist nature" in people. People living in these housing projects can either usually own their apartments or rent them, usually through a private landlord. There's usually a mix of social classes in these housing projects.

=== United Kingdom ===
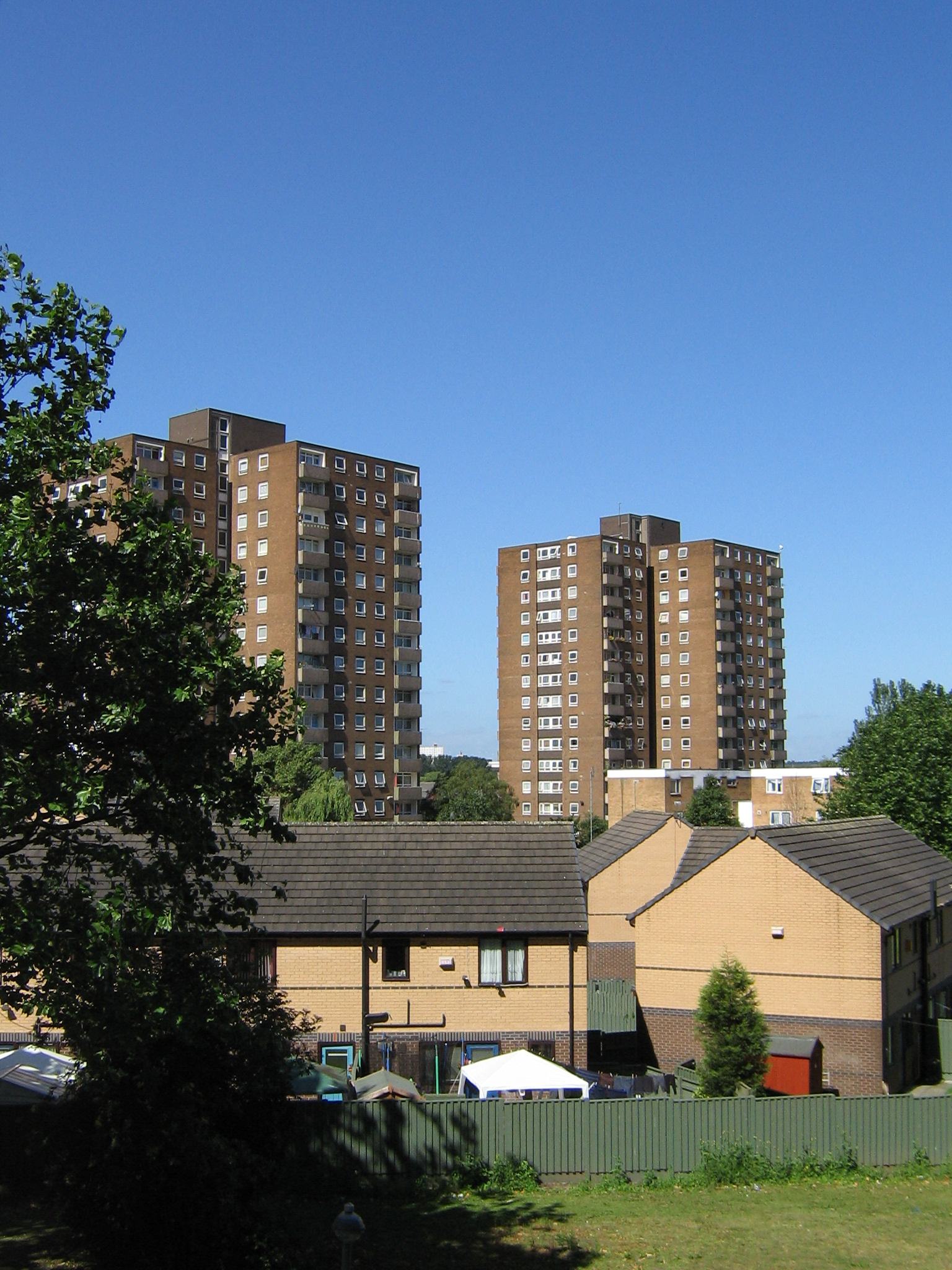
A variety of social housing in Salford, Greater Manchester, England.

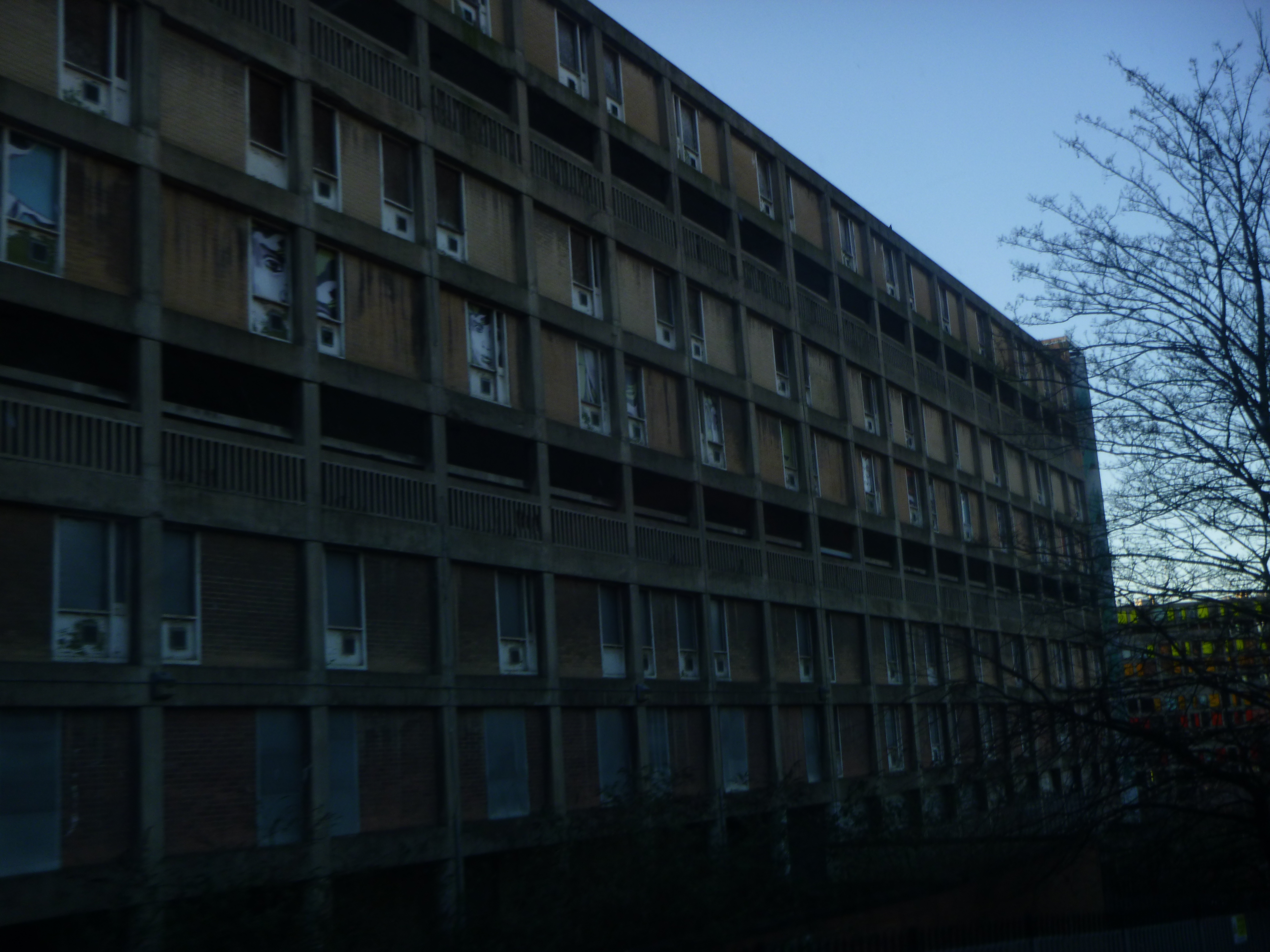
Park Hill in Sheffield, Yorkshire, England.

In the United Kingdom public housing is often referred to by the British public as "council housing" and "council estates", based on the historical role of district and borough councils in running public housing. Mass council house building began in about 1920 in order to replace older and dilapidated properties. This followed the 1919 'Addison' Act and the provision of central state subsidies; some local authority or municipal housing was provided before 1914.

Housing was a major policy area under Wilson's Labour government, 1964 to 1970, with an accelerated pace of new building, as there was still a great deal of unfit housing needing replacement. Tower blocks, first built in the 1950s, featured prominently in this era. The proportion of council housing rose from 42% to 50% of the nation's housing total, while the number of council homes built increased steadily, from 119,000 in 1964 to 133,000 in 1965 and to 142,000 in 1966.

Allowing for demolitions, 1.3 million new homes were built between 1965 and 1970. To encourage home ownership, the government introduced the Option Mortgage Scheme (1968), which made low-income house buyers eligible for subsidies (equivalent to tax relief on mortgage interest payments). This scheme had the effect of reducing housing costs for buyers on low incomes.

Since the 1970s, non-profit housing associations have been operating an increasing share of social housing properties in the United Kingdom. From 1996 they have also been known as registered social landlords (RSLs), and public housing has been referred to as "social housing" to encompass both councils and RSLs. Despite being non-profit based, RSLs generally charge higher rents than councils. However, the Westminster government introduced a "rent re-structuring" policy for housing associations in England in 2002, which aimed to bring council and RSL rents into line in England by 2012. Local planning departments may require private-sector developers to offer "affordable housing" as a condition of planning permission (section 106 agreement). This accounts for another £700m of government funding each year for tenants in part of the United Kingdom. As of 2012, housing associations are now also referred to as "private registered providers of social housing" (PRPs).

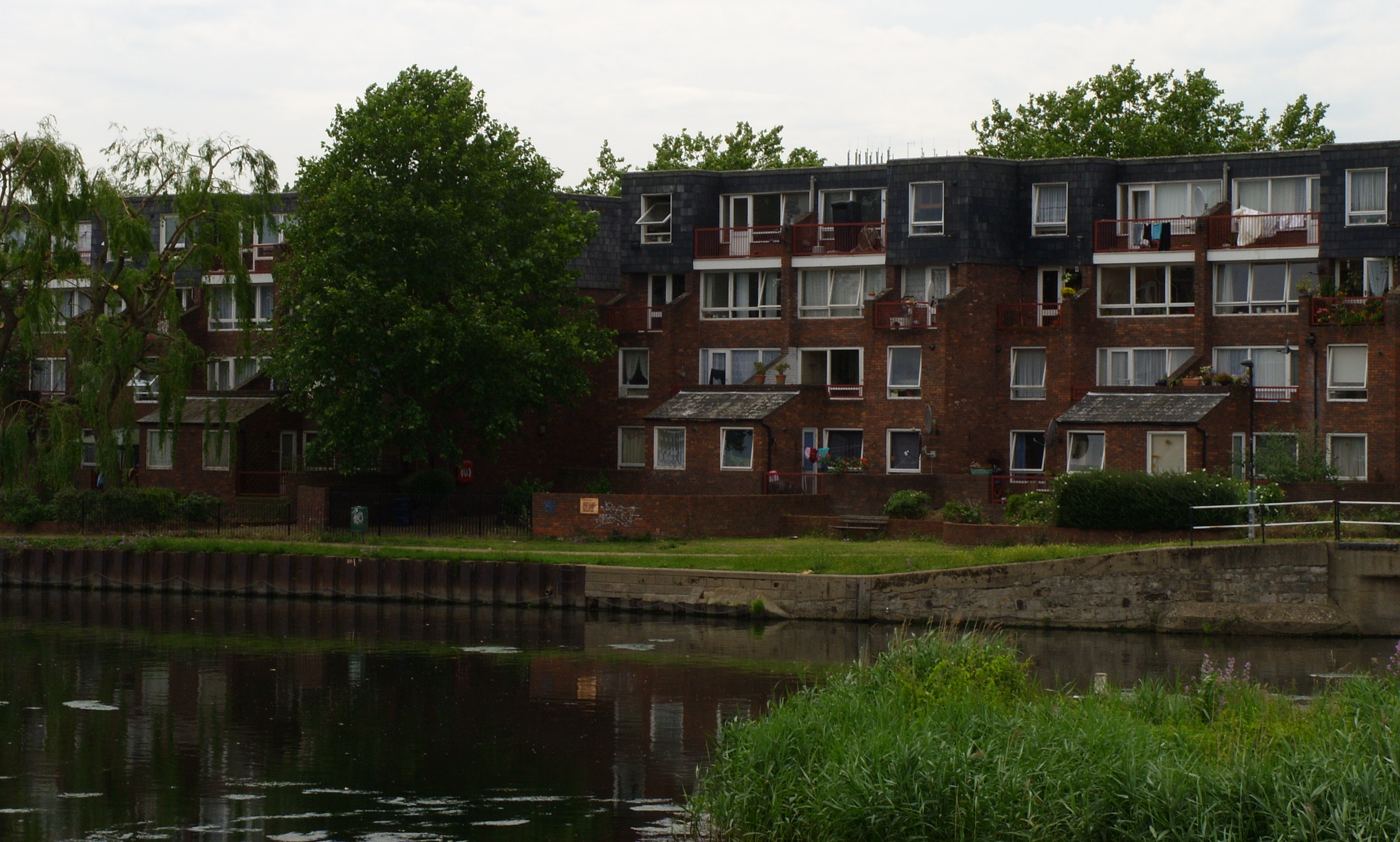
1970s council housing in Haringey, North London.

Local authorities have been discouraged from building council housing since 1979 following the election of Conservative leader Margaret Thatcher as prime minister. The Parker Morris standard was abolished for those that were built, resulting in smaller room sizes and fewer facilities. The Right to Buy was introduced, resulting in the move of some of the best stock from public tenanted to private owner occupation.

Since the year 2000, "choice-based lettings" (CBL) have been introduced to help ensure social housing was occupied speedily as tenants moved. This can still favour the local over the non-local prospective tenant. In a number of local authority areas, due to the shortage of council housing, three out of four properties may be designated for priority cases (those living in poor overcrowded conditions, with medical or welfare needs, or needing family support) or homeless applicants in order to meet the councils' legal obligations to rehouse people in need. The percentage of properties set aside for vulnerable groups will vary dependent on the demand for council housing in the area. All local authorities have a Housing Strategy to ensure that council houses are let fairly and fulfil the council's legal obligations; deal with people in need; and contribute to sustainability of housing estates, neighbourhood regeneration, and social inclusion.

The 1997–2010 Labour government wished to move council housing away from local authority management. At first, this was through large-scale voluntary transfers (LSVT) of stock from councils to housing associations (HAs). Not all council property could be transferred, as in some local authorities, their housing stock was in poor condition and had a capital value less than the remaining debts from construction costs—in effect, the council stock was in negative equity. In some local authority areas, the tenants rejected the transfer option.

The Labour government introduced a "third way": the arms-length management organisation (ALMO), where the housing stock stays with the local authority but is managed by a not-for-profit organisation at arm's length from the local authority. It also introduced the Decent Homes programme, a capital fund to bring social housing up to a modern physical standard. To use this fund, the manager, whether ALMO or HA, had to achieve a 2 or 3 star rating from its inspection by the Audit Commission. This was intended to drive up management standards. Council landlords cannot access this funding, another incentive to transfer management of council housing to an ALMO or HA.

Governments since the early 1990s have also encouraged "mixed tenure" in regeneration areas and on "new-build" housing estates, offering a range of ownership and rental options, with a view to engineering social harmony through including "social housing" and "affordable housing" options. A recent research report has argued that the evidence base for tenure mixing remains thin. Social housing occupants may be stigmatised and forced to use a poor door that is separate and less convenient than the door the unsubsidised occupants use and social housing may be less desirably situated.

After the adoption of austerity policies in 2010 the traditional "safety net" model was maintained by the devolved administrations like the Scottish and Welsh Parliaments and the Northern Ireland Assembly.

Most UK social housing tenants have the right to swap homes with another tenant even if their landlords are different. This is called a "mutual exchange". As of 2017, in England, local authorities can destinate homeless households in local tenancies, whereas in Scotland social housing remained the first chosen policy. According to the Museum of Homelessness, in 2020 the UK recorded at least 976 deaths among homeless people. In 2019 England and Wales estimated 778 deaths with an increase of 7.2% on the previous year.

=== Former Soviet Union ===
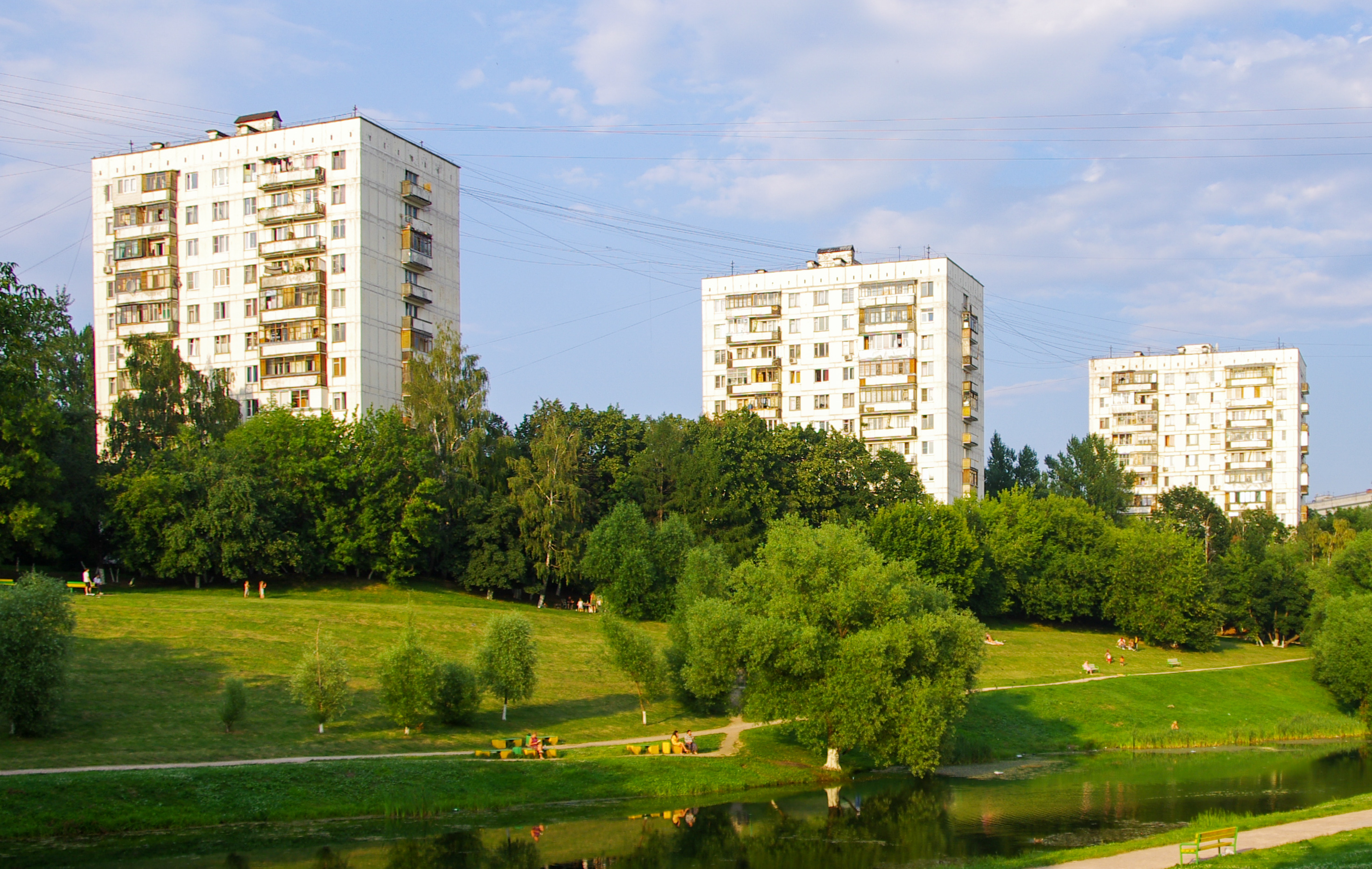
12-story residential buildings of late USSR, Moscow, Russia.

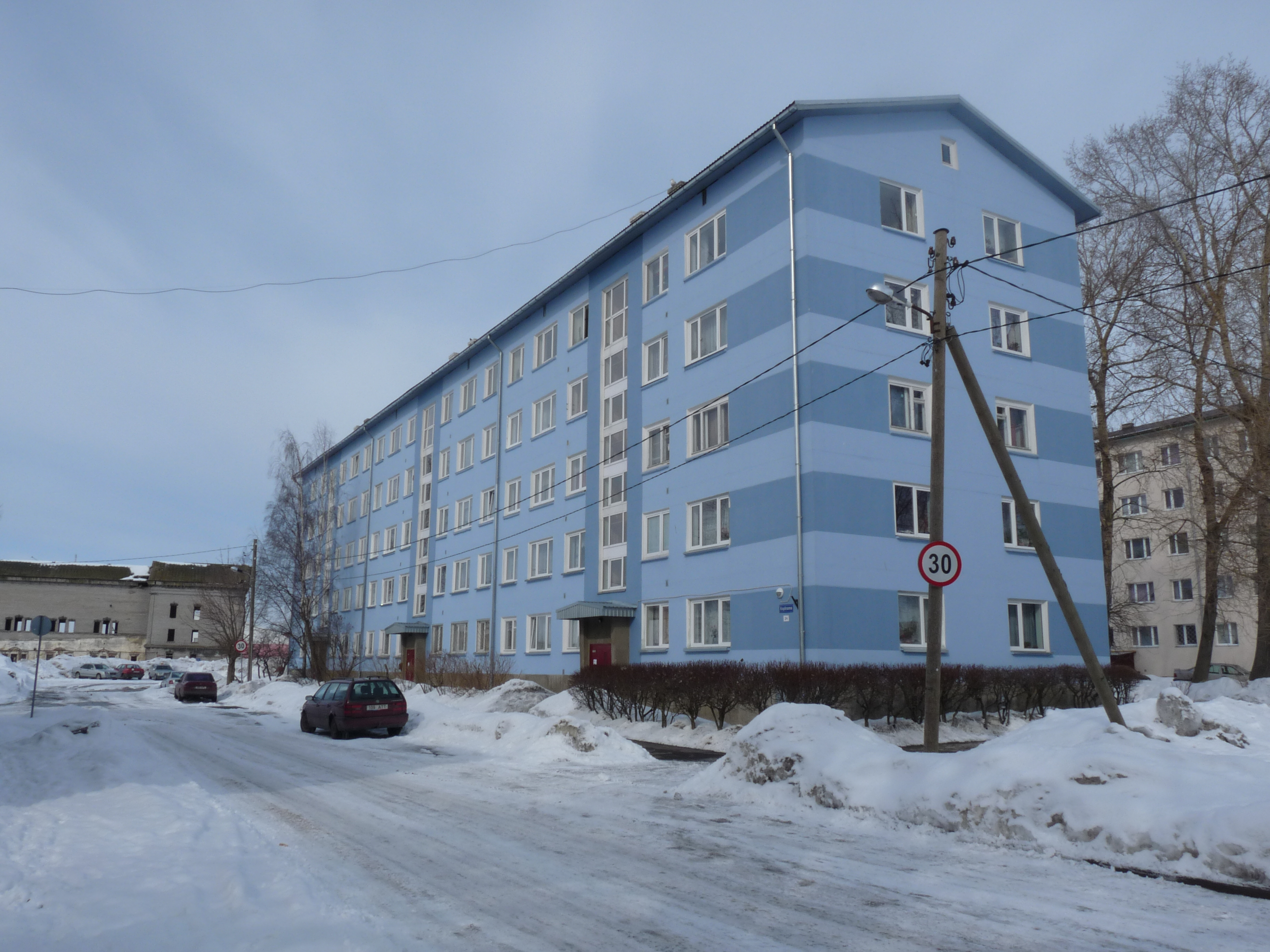
Refurbished 5-story Khrushchyovka, winter in Tallinn, Estonia

In the Soviet Union, most of the houses built after World War II were usually 3–5 stories high, with small apartments. In these boroughs, the goal was saving space and creating as many apartments as possible. Construction starting in the 1970s favored 9- and 16-story concrete panel municipal housing in major cities, 7–12 stories in smaller urban areas. These housing projects are still used in some countries, especially in countries in central and eastern Europe, and most of them are slowly being renovated.

== Oceania ==
=== Australia ===
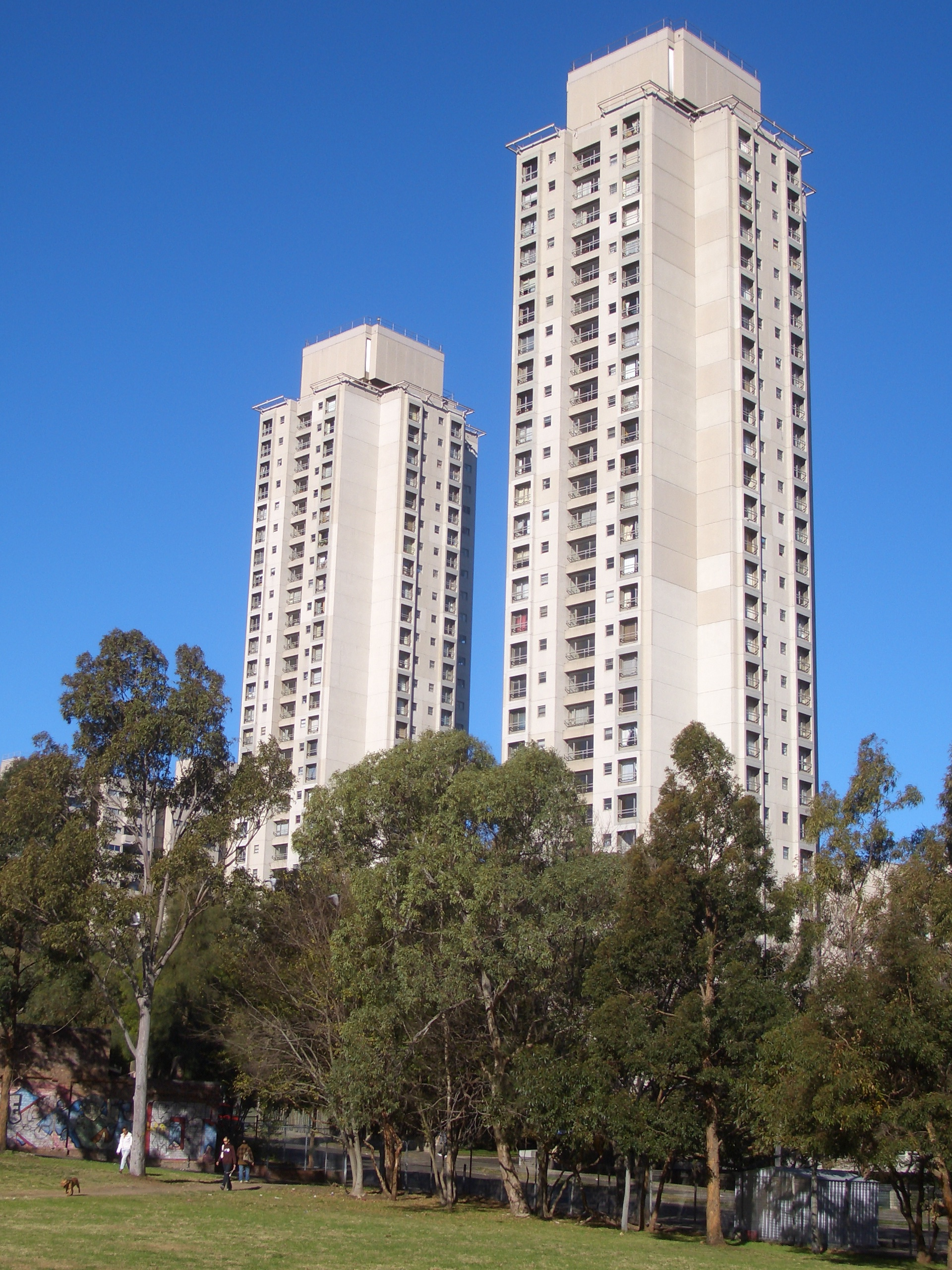
Public housing high-rise in the Inner-City Sydney Sydney suburb of Waterloo, two of 11 such towers in three different estates spread across the suburbs of Waterloo, Redfern and Surry Hills.

Public housing in Australia, also referred to as "housing commission", is managed by the states, with funding provided by both the state and federal governments. Policies vary by state, but generally, eligibility is based on personal or household income, asset limits and residency requirements. The allocation of public housing is typically done through a priority system where the applicants in the greatest need are housed first.

There are over 300,000 public housing dwellings in Australia, consisting of low-density housing on master-planned estates located in suburban areas, and also inner-city high-rise apartments in Melbourne and Sydney.

In recent decades, rooming and relief housing for the homeless have both been privatised, and in recent years this housing has been sold off to avoid maintenance costs and capitalise on sales in Australia’s booming property market. In Melbourne, public housing stocks have been in decline for some time, sparking the 2016 Bendigo Street housing dispute in which homeless people are being housed by the community campaign in homes left empty by the state government.

In 2016, a study by the Australian Housing and Urban Research Institute found an interesting effect of providing public housing to those living in poverty and who are at risk of losing their homes. When poor Western Australians were granted access to public housing, they began to rely on the region's healthcare system less, with immense savings for Western Australia. The reduction in the stress on hospitals, emergency rooms, and other forms of medical care projected to over $16 million saved for Western Australia per annum.

Recently, in a move to address the public housing crisis, Prime Minister Anthony Albanese announced an allocation of $2 billion to states and territories specifically for the development of social housing. This measure is part of the federal government's commitment to tackling housing affordability and homelessness across Australia. The Housing Minister has proposed a guaranteed annual expenditure of $500 million on public housing. However, this policy is contingent on garnering crossbench support to ensure its implementation.

=== New Zealand ===
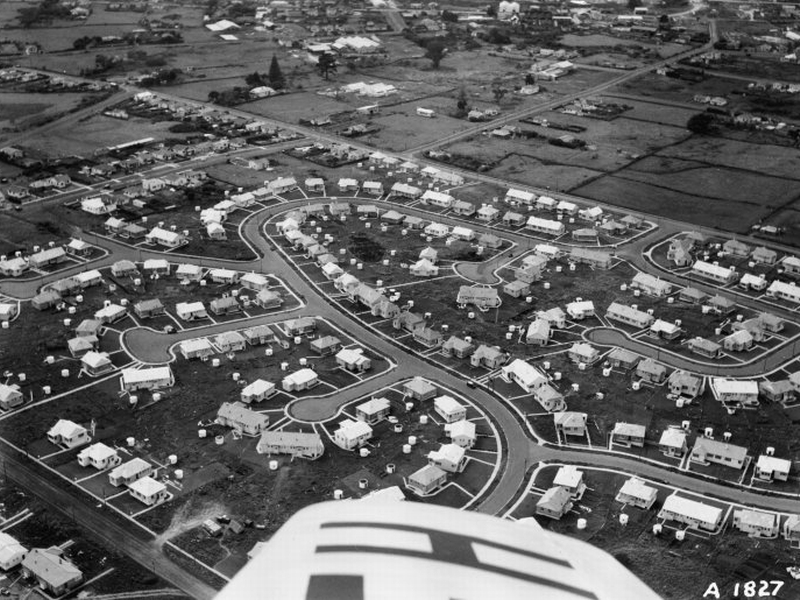
Unlike many other countries, much New Zealand state housing of the 20th century was in the form of detached single-family houses similar to private housing. This is a 1947 development in Oranga, Auckland.

Private companies (such as the New Zealand Company) which fostered early organised European settlement in New Zealand constructed immigration barracks to serve as temporary accommodation for their new arrivals.

The Workers' Dwellings Act of 1905 resulted in the New Zealand Government commissioning the building of 646 houses.

In 1937 the First Labour Government launched a major public-housing system—it became known as "state housing"—for citizens unable to afford private rents. Most state housing built between 1937 and the mid-1950s consisted of detached two-to-three-bedroom cottage-style houses; only 1.5% of state houses in 1949 formed part of apartment blocks, all of them in Auckland or in greater Wellington. After World War II ended in 1945, local authorities also started providing social housing, mainly for elderly people with low incomes.

== See also ==
- Fuggerei – The world's oldest social housing complex still in use
- Right to housing
- Housing estate
- Affordable housing
- Subsidized housing
- Subsidized housing in the United States
- Section 8
- Panelák and Sídlisko (Czech Republic and Slovakia)
- Social welfare
- Welfare state
- Tavros
- Discrimination against homeless people
- Broucheterre Swimming Pool
