= Homestay =

Form of hospitality and lodging

Homestay (also home stay and home-stay) is a form of hospitality and lodging whereby visitors share a residence with a local of the area (host) to which they are traveling. The length of stay can vary from one night to over a year and can be provided for free (gift economy), in exchange for monetary compensation, in exchange for a stay at the guest's property either simultaneously or at another time (home exchange), or in exchange for housekeeping or work on the host's property (barter economy). Homestays are examples of collaborative consumption and the sharing economy. Homestays are used by travelers; students who study abroad or participate in student exchange programs; and au pairs, who provide child care assistance and light household duties. They can be arranged via certain social networking services, online marketplaces, or academic institutions. Social networking services where hosts offer homestays for free are called hospitality exchange services.

== Advantages and disadvantages ==
Homestays offer several advantages, such as exposure to everyday life in another location, the opportunity to experience local culture and traditions, opportunities for cultural diplomacy, friendship, intercultural competence, and foreign language practice, local advice, and a lower carbon footprint compared to other types of lodging; however, they may have rules and restrictions, such as curfews, facility usage, and work requirements, and may not have the same level of comfort, amenities, and privacy as other types of lodging.

However, homestays might not have the privacy or standard hotel services like Wi-Fi and room service. Depending on the host, the experience's quality may vary, and some passengers may find difficulties due to linguistic or cultural issues and some may feel uncomfortable staying in someone’s home, sharing communal spaces, or being subject to house rules.

== Notable social networking services and online marketplaces for homestay arrangement ==
- Hospitality exchange services (Hospitality for free): BeWelcome, CouchSurfing, Dachgeber, Hospitality Club (defunct), Pasporta Servo, Servas International, Trustroots, Warm Showers
- Hospitality for work (farm stays): HelpX, Workaway, WWOOF
- Hospitality for money: 9flats, Airbnb, Booking.com, GuestReady, Hipcamp, misterb&b, Vrbo
- Home exchange and others: HomeExchange.com, Kindred, ThirdHome, Friendship Force International, Intervac International

== See also ==
- Backpacking
