= Workaway =

Online homestay platform

Workaway.info
- Show screenshot Screenshot of Workaway's homepage.
- Available in: English, Spanish, French, German, Portuguese
- Area served: Worldwide
- Owner: VEN ltd
- Industry: Travel industry
- Website: www.workaway.info
- Registration: Optional, site can be browsed without registering. Signing-up as a host is free. Paid subscriptions for volunteers.
- Launched: 17 April 2002; 24 years ago
- Current status: Online

Workaway is a platform that connects travellers with hosts to arrange homestays, in which travellers (known as "Workawayers") contribute a pre-agreed amount of time per day in exchange for food and lodging. Stays can range from a few days to more than a year.

Hosts post opportunities that can include gardening, animal-care, cooking and farming, and a range of specialist tasks.

The platform is used by budget travellers, language learners, people seeking longer or sustainable tourism, involving practical participation in local life.

Participants are responsIbile for complying with visa and immigration rules of the country in which they stay. Brexit has affected Workaway placements due to increased difficulty in obtaining work permits for the United Kingdom. In many cases, Workaway requires a work permit and cannot legally be done on a tourist visa. This has resulted in detention of participants by immigration authorities.

== See also ==
- CouchSurfing
- Homestay
- WWOOF
