= ADFC =

ADFC may refer to:

- Allgemeiner Deutscher Fahrrad-Club, German cyclists club
- Australian Defence Force Cadets, Australian youth development organization
