= Kyiv School of Ukrainian Language =

- Company type: Private
- Industry: Education
- Founded: 2008
- Headquarters: Kyiv, Ukraine
- Key people: Labinsky Oleksandr, Chairman, teacher, CEO and owner Sobko Lilia-Sofia, chief lawyer
- Products: Languages, translation, accommodation
- Number of employees: 5
- Website: www.ukrmova.at.ua

The Kyiv School of Ukrainian Language was founded as an institution to promote the external examination for the assessment of the education quality of Ukrainian secondary schools. Now it has developed into an educational language center.

== About the school ==
Among the school's goals are services of teaching Ukrainian language and translation, including:

- Business Ukrainian
- Ukrainian for beginners
- Ukrainian for getting citizenship in Ukraine
