= Pasporta Servo =

Hospitality exchange service

- Founded: 1966; 60 years ago
- Founder: Rubén Feldman González
- Location: Argentina
- Region served: Global
- Products: Homestay
- Services: Hospitality
- Members: 2257 hosts
- Website: pasportaservo.org

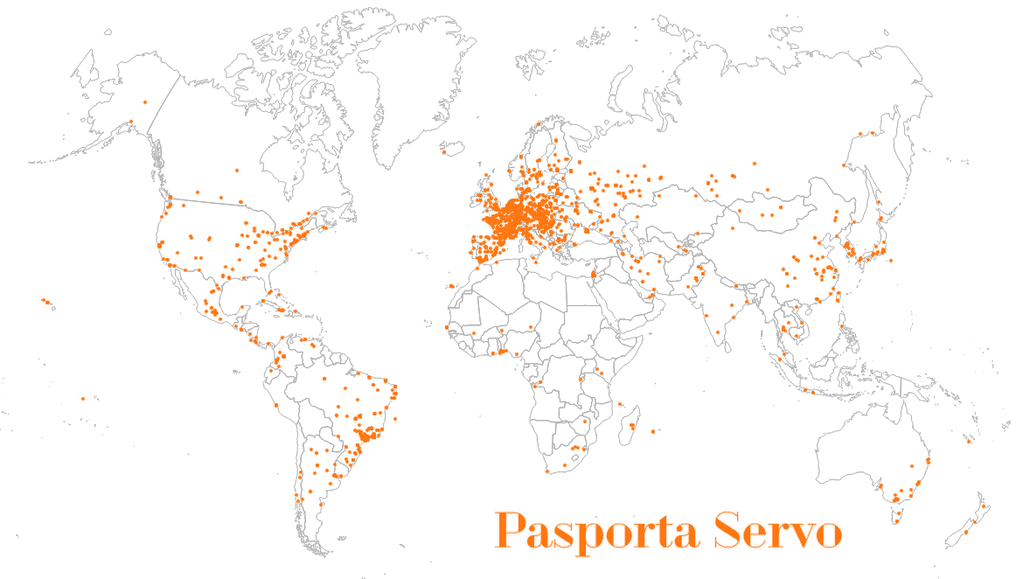
Cities in the world with Pasporta Servo hosts as of 2015

The Pasporta Servo (Esperanto pronunciation: [pasˈporta ˈservo], English: Passport Service) is a hospitality exchange service available both online and in print that lists people in Esperanto culture who are willing to offer free homestays to speakers of Esperanto. It is maintained by the World Esperanto Youth Organization (TEJO). The platform is a gift economy; hosts are not allowed to charge for lodging. Guests using the service are encouraged to speak only Esperanto with their hosts.

== History ==
In 1966, psychologist Rubén Feldman González started the Programo Pasporto, a lodging service for Esperanto speakers, in Argentina.

In 1974, the Pasporta Servo directory was first published, listing 40 hosts.

In August 2008, the directory was first published online.

=== Censorship ===
As of 2024, the online website has been blocked by the Iranian government, a change which has since been reverted.
