= Jinhua Homestay Project =

Jinhua Homestay Project is a hospitality exchange service organized by the Jinhua Municipal People's Government Foreign and Overseas Chinese Affairs Office. It is a Home+ project initiated to promote tourism in the villages of China by using idle village resources. The project invites overseas students to stay for a period of 3 weeks and experience Chinese culture in one of the villages of Jinhua. Sessions have been held in Siping, Suoyuan and Yuyuan. During their stay the participants experience and perform various activities which enable them to learn more about traditional Chinese culture, local customs and folklores.

The project conducts two sessions per year and every session is in a different village. The cost incurred during the project is entirely paid by the project management authorities. The participants will stay with a Chinese family and experience the traditional Chinese lifestyle.

The participants have to perform a number of tasks during their stay with the purpose to provide for ideas and suggestions to preserve, protect and promote the ancient Chinese villages. The four sessions to date have attracted 163 overseas participants from 27 countries. They made village maps, studied ancient architecture, learned local folk culture and interviewed villagers to discover ancient stories, contributing to the protection and development of the ancient villages.

The activities participants engage in include pottery, calligraphy, tea making, wu opera, dragon dancing, wood painting, and Chinese Martial Arts.

== History ==
This project is the first of its kind nationally, and it is aimed at protecting traditional village life. In order to cultivate understanding of traditional ways of life, this program was initiated by the Jinhua Municipal People's government foreign and overseas Chinese affairs office. The very first session of the program was held in the year 2014 in Suoyuan village.
