= Servas International =

Non-profit organization

- Founded: July 1949; 77 years ago in Denmark
- Founder: Bob Luitweiler USA
- Type: Non-governmental organization
- Legal status: Non-profit association under Swiss law
- Purpose: Promote peace through travel and cultural exchange
- Headquarters: Zürich, Switzerland
- Region served: Worldwide
- Products: Homestay
- Services: Social networking service
- Official language: English, French, German, Italian and Spanish
- President: Radha Radhakrishna USA
- Key people: Radha Radhakrishna – SI President (USA); Carla Kristensen – SI Vice President (Portugal); Gülşen Elyak – SI Treasurer (Germany); Kent Machaulay – SI General Secretary (Canada); Francisco Salomon Luna Aburto – Peace Secretary (Mexico); Paul Nielsen – SI Membership and Technology Secretary (Australia)
- Website: www.servas.org

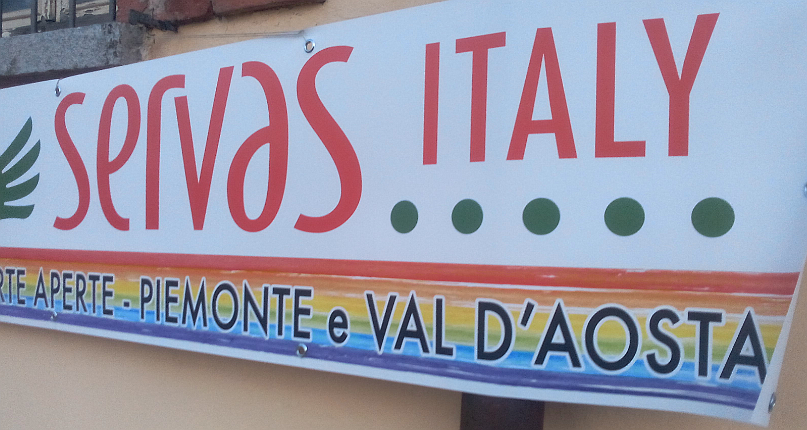
A Servas local meeting in Collegno, Italy in 2016

Servas International ("we serve (peace)" in Esperanto) is a non-profit organization providing a hospitality exchange service to build peace and cross-cultural understanding through day visits or overnight home stays among members. It was founded in 1949, in the aftermath of World War II, by Bob Luitweiler and other Danish students as an international network for people to meet and where suitable, to be offered a short stay, as part of the peace movement.

The organization may now be described as a platform, part of a gift economy. Members can be both hosts and travellers, and hosts do not charge for lodging. Members pay an annual fee to the organization, which is determined locally by country. There is an international executive and each country has an elected board or committee to manage membership (including interviews for new applicants), determine membership fees, organise social events, support various peace-related activities.

Servas is owned by an accredited Non-governmental organization and has been affiliated with the Economic and Social Council of the United Nations since 1973.

== Servas and the United Nations ==
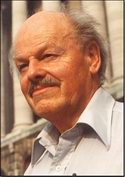

== History ==
Servas was founded in 1949, in the aftermath of World War II, by Bob Luitweiler and other Danish students as an international network for people to meet and where suitable, to be offered a short stay, as part of the peace movement.

In 1989, Pat Knowles wrote a useful account of Servas, from its beginnings up to 1989 that focused on peacebuilding and friendship, and networking. Servas International's Peace Secretary was in touch with some international organisations including War Resisters' International, Women's International League for Peace and Freedom, Quaker United Nations Office, Pax Christi International. In illustration of its UN status, Knowles reproduced Servas International's submission to the UN Special Session on Disarmament in 1978. Knowles also described the initiative in 1986 for Servas groups to recruit a national peace secretary with duties like those of Servas International Peace Secretary. Contributions from the peace secretaries of Germany, Poland and Israel are included. Knowles explores the connection between travel and understanding asking about the early study groups on non-violence techniques and the question 'can we travel too far, too fast?'

Founding countries:

 Jamaica,  Northern Ireland,  Austria,  United Kingdom,  Ireland,  Denmark,  Iceland,  France,  Germany,  Italy,  Japan,  Kenya,  Netherlands,   Switzerland,  Tanzania,  United States

In 2006 Servas International started a Servas On Line project replacing its paper based system

At the General Assembly in 2006 a distant vote procedure was created for Italy.

== Servas Traditional Meetings ==
=== Sentierinsieme/Pathways Together ===
Organized in July in Italy, France, Switzerland and Germany "Sentierinsieme" is the Servas traditional yearly alpine event - organized since 1985 -where Servas members from all over the world come together.

Raymond Forget (Servas France) and with Luigi Uslenghi (Servas Italy) founded "Pathways Together" in 1985.

Year	No	Country	Place	Dates
2026	40	France	Haute Maurienne, Vanoise	June 26 – July 2
2025	39	Switzerland	in Zinal in the Valais mountains	4–10 July
2024	38	Germany	Hintersee/ region Berchtesgaden Baviera	19–25 July
2023	37	Italy	Oropa, Biella, Piedmont – Italy	7–13 July
2022	36	France	in Briancon	1–7 July
2021			Canceled due to Pandemi	
2020			Canceled due to Pandemi	
2019	35	Switzerland	Mürren (Berner Oberland)	July
2018	34	Germany	Germany Allgäu	6–12 July
2017	33	Italy	Varaita Valley, Monviso mountain	30 June-5 July
2016	32	France	Contamines Montjoie in the Mont Blanc region	1–7 July
2015	31	Switzerland	in Bergün	July
2014	30	Germany	Austrian valle	July
2013	29	Italy	Piedmont	July
2012	28	France	-	July
2011	27	Switzerland	in the area of Flumserberg-Tannenboden	24–30 June
2010	26	Germany	-	July
2009	25	Italy	Piedmont: Val d'Ossola	18–23 July
2008	24	France	-	July
2007	23	Switzerland	-	July
2006	22	Germany	-	July
2005	21	Italy	Valsesia & Cinque Terre	July
2004	20	France	-	July
2003	19	Switzerland	-	July
2002	18	Italy	Val d'Aosta	July
2001	17	France	-	July
2000	16	Switzerland		July 2000
1999	15	Italy	village of Arpy in the Aosta Valley	2–4 July
1998	14	France	in Bénarde	1–4 July
1997	13	Switzerland	at Fafleralp	11–13 July
1996	12	Italy	Pra Catinat in the Piedmont region	1–4 July
1995	11	France	in the French Alps at Fort Marie Christine near the Vanoise National Park	July
1994	10	Switzerland	Matherhorn	15–17 July
1993	9	Italy	Alpe Veglia Natural Park	16–18 July
1992	8	France	in Les Chapieux	29–30 August
1991	7	Italy	Mount Chaberton	13–15 July
1990	6	France	in the JURA, Saint Claude	14–15 July
1989	5	Italy	Alpe Veglia	14–16 July
1988	4	France	at the Albert Faletti Foundation chalet in Chinaillon (Haute-Savoie).	15–17 June
1987	3	Italy	Val Maira	July
1986	2	France	-	July
1985	1	Italy	Dolomite Mountains, in Val di Fassa	23–30 July

=== Alpe Adria Meetings ===
September–October in Austria, Italy, Slovenia Slovakia, Czech Republic and Germany

#	Year	Date	Place	Country
01	1989	September 29	Camporosso	Italy
02	1990	October 12–14	Grožnjan/Piran	ex Yugoslavia
03	1991	October 11–13	Wien	Austria
04	1992	October 16–18	Bagni di Lusnizza	Italy
05	1994	June 17–19	Bovec	Slovenia
06	1995	June 2–4	St. Gilgen	Austria
07	1996	June 7–9	Gemona	Italy
08	1998	6	Rakov Škocjan	Slovenia
09	1999	May 14–16	Salzburg	Austria
10	1999	September 11–13	Krk	Croatia
11	2000		Cividale del Friuli	Italy
12	2001		near Nürnberg	Germany
13	2002		Istanbul	Turkey
14	2003	(no info)		
15	2004	June 25–27	Dolenjska	Slovenia
16	2005	May 27–29	Tarcento	Italy
17	2006		Admont, Steiermark	Austria
18	2007	August 17–19	Poppberg/Birgland	Germany
19	2008	September 19–21	Gorizia	Italy
20	2009	September 18–20	Bratislava	Slovakia
21	2010	September 24–26	Bohinjsko Jezero	Slovenia
22	2011	September 9–11	Hotel Park Oasi, Arta Terme	Italy
23	2012	September 28–30	Youth Hostel Kreuzlingen	Switzerland
24	2013	September 20–22	Hotel Dermuth, Klagenfurt	Austria
25	2015	September 18–24	Penzion Polana, Horný Smokovec	Slovakia
26	2016	September 16–18	Villa San Fermo, Lonigo	Italy
27	2017	September 22–24	Hotel Luitpold am See, Chiemsee	Germany
28	2018	September 14–16	Kamp Koren, Kobarid	Slovenia
29	2019	September 20–22	Sport Hotel Zátoň near Český Krumlov	Czech
30	2023	October 6–8	Schloss Weinberg, Kefermarkt	Austria
31	2024	September 27–29	Hotel Urpin City Residence, Banská Bystrica	Slovakia(invitation)
32	2025	September	Burghausen	Germany

== Groups/Member Groups ==
Member Group	Status	#Host	Member since	Founder/Starter	Started
Albania	Ex-Member	8			1995
Algeria	Ex-Member	12			1989
Argentina	Member	138	1989	Enrique Reigosa	1960
Armenia		2			
Australia	Member	697	1972	Margaret Smith	1960
Austria	Founding Member	229	1972	Kurt Schmid	1949
Bahrain		1			
Bangladesh	Member	49	2015	Syed Muhammed Husain	2015
Belarus	Member	49	2018		1995
Belgium and Luxemburg	Member	323	1972	Wilfried De Vlieghere	1960
Benin		11			
Bhutan		1			
Bolivia	Member	23	2018	Dr. Ruth Tichauer	1995
Botswana	Member	18	1998		1998
Brazil	Member	144	1989		1970
United Kingdom Ireland	Founding Member	568	1972-1983	Barbara Acquah (GB)	1949
Brunei		-			1995
Bulgaria	Member	16	2022		2015
Burundi		4			
Cambodia		5			
Cameroon	Member	32	2009		2009
Canada	Member	630	1974		1960
Chile	Member	34	1995		1995
China	Member	28	2004		2004
Colombia	Member	99	1976	Octavio Morales Alvarado	1963
Congo Kinshasa (DRC)		10			
Costa Rica	Member	59	1989	Rafaela Mora Mora	1989
Croatia	Member	17	2004		2004
Cuba	Member	14	2025		1978
Cyprus		1			
Czech Republic	Member	113	1989		1989
Denmark Iceland	Founding Member	251	1972	Nana Funder(sos), Birgitte Damsgaard	1949
Dominican Republic	Ex-Member	6			
Ecuador	Ex-Member	13			
Egypt	Ex-Member	6			1978
Estonia	Ex-Member	3			
Ethiopia		7			
Falkland Islands		1			
Finland	Member	64	1989	Albert Szabo	1970
France	Founding Member	2075	1972	Joseph Girard	1949
Gambia	Member	16	2018		1998
Georgia	Member	10	2012		2012
Germany	Founding Member	2258	1972	Antonie Fried, Claus Weiss (sos)	1949
Ghana	Ex-Member	4			1976
Greece	Ex-Member	24			
Guatemala	Member	27	1989		1989
Honduras	Ex-Member	19			1989
Hong Kong	Member	36	1992		1992
Hungary	Member	101	1989		1989
Iceland		3			1998
India	Member	260	1974	Harivallabh bhai Parikh	1951
Indonesia	Member	25	1995		1995
Iran	Member	35	2012		2012
Israel	Member	183	1974	Joseph Abileah	1966
Italy	Founding Member	1054	1972	Maria Soresina,	1972
Jamaica	Founder	0		Florette Case	1964 (ref:SIN #1)
Japan	Founding Member	207	1972	Masuo Amano	1964 (ref:SIN #1)
Jordan		2			
Kazakhstan	Ex-Member	24			2009
Kenya	Founding Member	24	2018		1972
Korea	Member	267	1974		1965
Kosovo		1			
Kyrgyzstan	Member	20	2004	Devendra Pal Singh	2003 (ref: SIN#45)
Laos		2			
Latvia	Ex-Member	14			1992
Lebanon		4			
Lithuania	Ex-Member	14			1992
Madagascar		5			
Malawi	Member	53	2004		2004
Malaysia	Member	34	2004		2004
Mali		10			
Malta		3			1983
Mauritius		5			1978
Mexico	Member	90	1976		1954
Moldova		1			
Mongolia		6			
Morocco	Member	25	1998		1998
Myanmar		1			
Nepal	Member	70	2012	Nutan Thapalia	1984
Netherlands	Founding Member	271	1972	Joop van der Spek (sos), Arthur J. Sietsma Sr.	1950
New Zealand	Member	410	1972	Robert Henry and Vivienne Ellis	1969
Nicaragua		1			
Nigeria	Ex-Member	11			1974
Northern Ireland	Founder	0		Jo Overgaard	1972
Norway	Member	133	1978	Jo Overgaard	1974
Pakistan	Member	42	2022	Abdul Hameed Khan	1974
Palestine		9			
Panama	Member	23	1992		1992
Paraguay	Member	24	1995		1995
Peru	Member	14	2023 (DV)		1998
Philippines	Ex-Member	15			1989
Poland	Member	230	1989		1970
Portugal	Member	87	1983	António Serzedelo	1983
Republic of the Congo Brazzaville (RC)		11			2009
Romania	Ex-Member	26			1992
Russia	Member	102	1989		1989
Rwanda	Member	50	2015		2015
São Tomé and Príncipe		1			
Saudi Arabia		14			
Senegal	Ex-Member	2			1989
Serbia		8			
Sierra Leone	Ex-Member	5			
Singapore	Ex-Member	14			
Slovakia	Member	35	1991	Milan Šimečka	1991
Slovenia		17			
South Africa	Member	27	1986		1986
Spain	Member	579	1983	Juan A. Sanchez,	1983
Sri Lanka	Ex-Member	7			1976
Suriname		13			
Sweden	Member	281	1976	Ulf & Barbro Löwhagen	1972
Switzerland	Founding Member	245	1972	Denise Vollenweider	1949
Taiwan	Member	109	2009		2009
Tanzania	Founding Member	32	2021 (DV)		2021
Thailand	Member	36	1992	Reginald Price	1992
Togo	Ex-Member	1			1998
Trinidad and Tobago		2			
Tunisia	Member	5	2026	Adel Ali	1990
Turkey	Member	135	1992	Aykut Güzer	1978
Uganda	Member	52	-	Davis M. Masifa	1980
Ukraine	Member	20	2012		2012
United Arab Emirates		10			
United States	Founding Member	1509	1972	Bob Luitweiler	1952
Uruguay	Member	33	1983	Jorge Zoppolo	1980
Uzbekistan	Ex-Member	5			2001
Venezuela	Member	43			1990
Vietnam	Member	25	2015		2015
Yemen	Ex-Member	0			1974
Zambia	Member	14	1998		1980
Zimbabwe	Ex-Member	6	-		1995

*(sos): Seeds of Servas, by Bob Luitweiler (DV): Distant Vote

== Member groups on the map ==
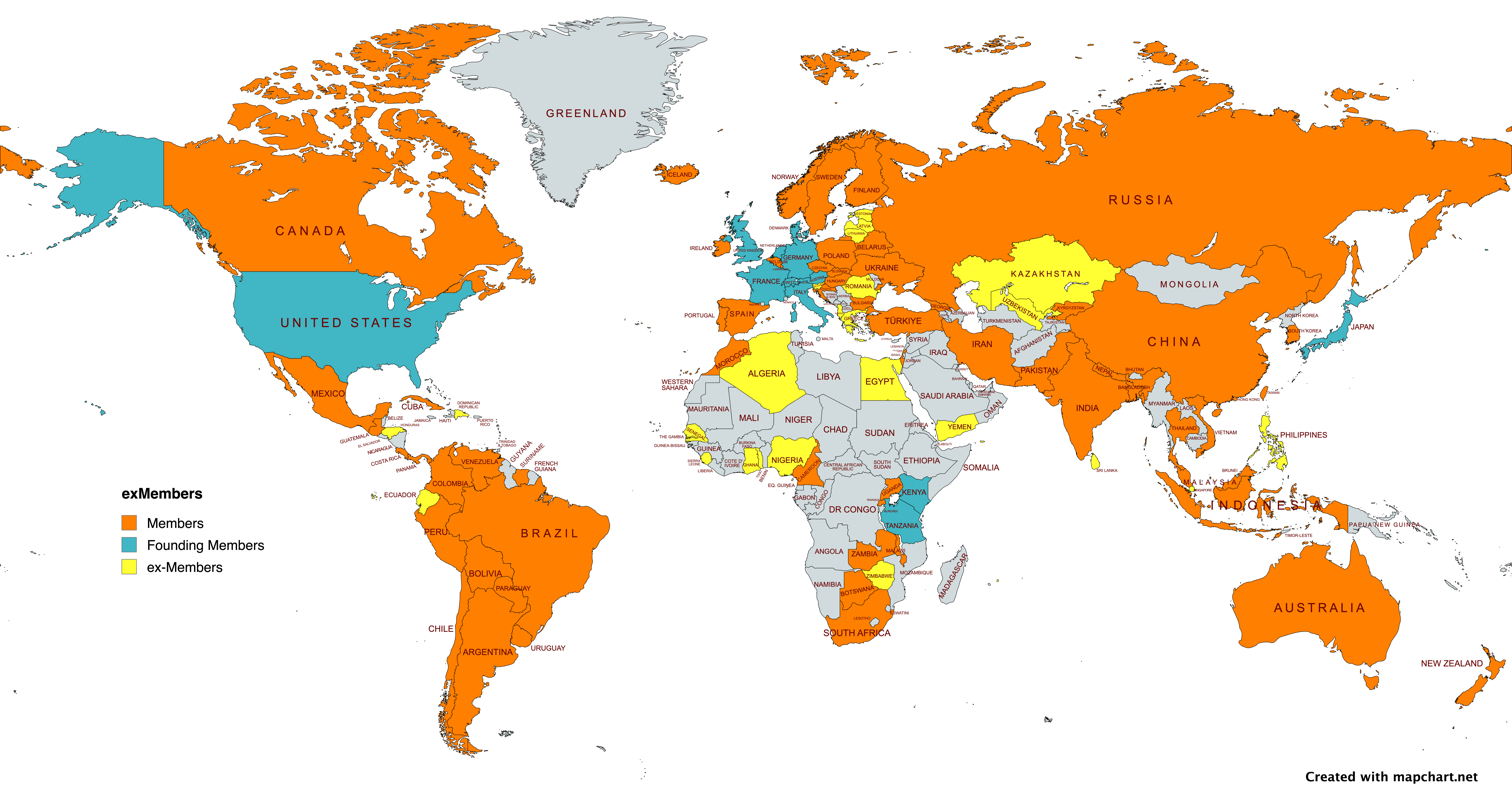
Servas Groups

== Servas International General Assemblies ==
1952 Germany Hamburg First Peace Builders International Conference, Out of which came the name "Servas"

In 2025 the SIGA will be held in Dijon, France, October 3–9.

#	Year	Country	Place	Delegate	#Member groups
#1	1952	Germany	Hamburg	4 Delegates	Only England, Denmark and Germany were officially represented.
#2	1953	Denmark	Askov	6 votes	
#3	1954	Netherlands	Epe	10 delegates	
#4	1955	Germany	Schuluchsee	9 votes	
#5	1958	Austria	Landeck (Tyrol)		
#6	1959	Netherlands	Oosterwijk		
#7	1960	Belgium	Ghent		
#8	1961	no detailed info	-		
#9	1964	France	Paris		
#10	1965	Austria	Vienna, 8–12 July	5 delegates	Present: Austria, Kurt Schmid, France, Joseph Girard, USA, Reva King, Switzerland, Bernhard Vogoli, International Co-ordination, Pat Knowles
#11	1966	Denmark	Copenhagen, 8–11 April	7 delegates	Participants: Switzerland, Norway, Austria, USA, GB, Denmark, India
#12	1967	Czechoslovakia	Bratislava		
#13	1970	Austria	Vienna, 7–9 August	13 delegates	Participants: Austria, Benelux, Denmark, France, Germany, Great Britain, Hungary, India, Italy, New Zealand, Sweden, Switzerland, USA,
#14	1972	Germany	Wetzlar, 7 July	16 delegates	Servas International officially founded by: Austria, Denmark, England, France, Germany, Italy, Jamaica, Japan, Kenya, Netherlands, Northern Ireland, Switzerland, Tanzania and USA, Grant member status to: Belgium, New Zealand, Australia and Kenya (4 Groups) Lost their membership status: Non
#15	1974	Switzerland	Arcegno, Campo Pestalozzi, 23–26 August	17 delegates	Grant member status to: Canada, India, Israel, Korea, New Zealand, Yemen, Nigeria (7 groups) Lost their membership status: Non
#16	1976	United States	at the International Student Center of the University of California, Los Angeles, in Westwood, 1–7 August	21 delegates	Grant member status to: Non Lost their membership status: Non
#17	1978	Denmark	Elsanor, 16–18 August	22 delegates	Grant member status to: Poland, Norway, Egypt, Mauritius (4 Groups) Lost their membership status: Non
#18	1980	India	Gujarat	22 delegates	Grant member status to: Hungary, Yugoslavia, Zambia, Ghana (4 Groups) Lost their membership status: Non
#19	1983	Israel	Nahariya, 5–10 April	16 delegates, 8 Exco(-2 delegates), 22 votes	Grant member status to: Greece, Portugal, Ireland, Spain, Malta, Uruguay (6 Groups) Lost their membership status: Egypt, Yemen
#20	1986	Italy	Roma, 16–20 May	25 delegates, 14 Exco (-4 delegates), 35 votes	Grant member status to: Guadeloupe, Nepal
#21	1989	Canada	Montreal, Quebec, 25–27 July	48 delegates	Grant member status to: Argentina, Bangladesh, Brazil, Bulgaria, Costa Rica, Czechoslovakia, Guatemala, Honduras, Hungary, Philippines, Poland, Senegal, and the Soviet Union, South Africa (14 Groups) Lost their membership status: Malta, Nigeria
#22	1992	France	Paris, 26 June	47 votes	Grant member status to: Thailand, Turkey, Hong Kong, Lithuania, Latvia, Panama, Romania (7 Groups) Lost their membership status: Nigeria, Philippines; Zambia and Sri Lanka (4 Groups) Russia replaced Soviet Union Yugoslavia divided
#23	1995	Australia	Melbourne, 8–13 April	36 delegates, 8 SI Exco, 44 votes	Grant member status to: Albania, Algeria, Belarus, Bolivia, Brunei, Chile, Estonia, Indonesia, Malaysia, Nigeria, Paraguay and Zimbabwe (12 Groups) Lost their membership status: Non 66 Member groups after GA (ref: 1995 SIGA Minutes)
#24	1998	Guatemala	Antigua Guatemala	40 votes	Grant member status to: Botswana, Gambia, Iceland, Morocco, Pakistan, Peru, Philippines, Samoa, Sri Lanka, Togo, Zambia (11 Groups) Lost their membership status: Albania, Malta
#25	2001	Thailand	Nakhon Nayok, 16–19 July	48 delegates	Grant member status to: Croatia, Singapore, Sri Lanka, Surinam, Uzbekistan (5 Groups) Lost their membership status: Belarus
#26	2004	Spain	Barcelona, 18–24 July	45 delegates	Grant member status to: Malawi, China, Malaysia, Kyrgyzstan, Croatia (5 Groups) Lost their membership status: Kenya, Tanzania, Mali, Cuba (4 Groups)
#27	2006	Italy	Latina, 2–8 April	42 delegates	Grant member status to: Egypt, Ghana, Ukraine (3 Groups) Lost their membership status: Bolivia, Greece
#28	2009	Argentina	Mar Del Plata, 6–12 September	45 delegates	Grant member status to: Bolivia, Cameroon, Congo-Brazzaville, Greece, Kazakhstan, Taiwan (6 Groups) Lost their membership status: Bangladesh, Ghana, Gambia, Ukraine, Nepal, Samoa, Zimbabwe, Netherlands Antilles, Mauritius, Latvia (10 Groups)
#29	2012	Poland	Piaski, 18–25 August	51 delegates	Grant member status to: Georgia, Nepal, Ukraine, Kenya, Iran (5 Groups) Lost their membership status: Latvia, Estonia, Egypt, Togo, Senegal, Bulgaria, Iceland, Philippines (8 Groups)
#30	2015	New Zealand	Matamata, 10–16 October	54 delegates	Grant member status to: Rwanda, Vietnam, Bangladesh, Bulgaria (4 Groups) Lost their membership status: Kenya, Sri Lanka, Bolivia, Uzbekistan (4 Groups)
#31	2018	South Korea	Seoul 13 to 20 October	45 delegates	Grant member status to: Bolivia, Belarus, Kenya, Gambia (4 Groups) Lost their membership status: Lithuania, Pakistan, Congo-Brazzaville, Ecuador (4 Groups)
	2021	Distant Vote	Distant Vote		Reinstate as Member Group : Tanzania
#32	2022	India	Panchgani, 25–26 November	39 delegates (3 online)	Grant member status to: Pakistan Lost their membership status: Honduras, Bulgaria, Slovenia, Sierra Leone, Peru, Greece, Kazakhstan (7 Groups)
	2023	Distant Vote	Distant Vote		Reinstate as Member Group : Peru 72 Member groups after DV (Ref: SIGA Documents: Member Groups)
#33	2025	France	Dijon 3–9 October	45 delegates (including 1 online)	Grant member status to: Cuba Lost their membership status: Singapore, Romania 71 Member groups after GA
	2026	Distant Vote	May		Grant member status to: Tunisia

== Servas International Leadership ==
Servas international conferences

=== 1951 ===
Founders of Servas were those dedicated people like Bob Luitweiler, Connie Thorpe, Esma Burrough and the others in the Birmingham, England Peace Builder's team, and, Esther Harlan in California.

Esma Burrough UK, was the first International Servas secretary. Seeds Of Servas

=== 1961-1965 ===
International Coordinator Pat KNOWLES - England

=== 1966 -1970 ===
International Coordinator Kurt Schmids - Austria

=== 1970-1972 ===
==== Executive Committee ====
Position	Name	Group
International Coordinator	Kurt Schmid	Austria
Assistant Int. Coordinator	Reva King	USA
Assistant Int. Coordinator in Training	Barbara Trischuk	

==== Officers ====
Position	Name	Group
Regional Coordinator – South Asia & Global Outreach	Harivallabh Parikh	India
Regional Coordinator – East Africa & Pacific	Barbara Trischuk	
Regional Coordinator – North Africa	Joseph Girard	France
Regional Coordinator – Eastern Europe	(Kurt Schmid)	Austria

=== 1972-1974 ===
==== Executive Committee ====
Position	Name	Group
President & Int. Coordinator	Kurt Schmid	Austria
Vice President & Ass't Int. Coordinator	Reva King	USA
Treasurer	Denise Vollenweider	Switzerland
Assistant Treasurer	Swiss Servas member (to be appointed)	
Secretary	Birgitte Damsgaard	Denmark
Vice Secretary	Maria Soresina	Italy
Peace Secretary	Jim Ryding	

==== Officers ====
Position	Name	Group
Newsletter Editor	Maria Soresina	Italy
Regional Coordinator – Europe	Denise Vollenweider	Switzerland
Regional Coordinator – Africa	Titus Mugavana	Kenya
Regional Coordinator – North America	Reva King	USA
Regional Coordinator – Latin America	Laura Langagne	Mexico
Regional Coordinator – South Pacific	Max Hartin	

=== 1974-1976 ===
==== Executive Committee ====
Position	Name	Group
President	Reva King	USA
Vice-president	Harivallabh Parikh	India
Treasurer	Denise Vollenweider	Switzerland
Assistant Treasurer	Doris Bilcher	Switzerland
Secretary	Birgitte Damnsgaard	Denmark
Assistant Secretary	Ronald Golding	Australia
Peace Secretary	Hans Werner Emrich	Yemen

==== Officers ====
Position	Name	Group
Newsletter Editor	Barbara Acquach	United Kingdom
Assistant Editor	Martha Simon	USA
Europe Regional co-ordinator	Antonie Fried	Germany
Africa Regional co-ordinator	Lydi Jones	USA
South pasific Regional co-ordinator	John and Judy Ebner	Japan
Mexico and Central Regional co-ordinator	Laura Langagne	Mexico
South America Regional co-ordinator	Marcello Lorenzo	Argentina

Source: SI NEWS #06

=== 1978-1980 ===
==== Executive Committee ====
Position	Name	Group
President	Graham Thomas	UK
Treasurer	Doris Bucher	Switzerland
Assistant Treasurer	Denise Waech	Switzerland
General Secretary	Barbara Whitehead	UK
Vice-president	Martha Simon	USA
Assistant General Secretary	Reva King	USA
Peace Secretary	Konrad Lübbert	Germany

==== Committees and Officers ====
Position	Name	Group
S.I.N. Editor	Donald Fawcett	USA
Regional Coordinator – Africa	Lydia Jones	USA
Regional Coordinator – Europe	Antonie Fried	Germany
Regional Coordinator – South America	Marcelo Lorenzo	Argentina
Regional Coordinator – South Pacific	John and Judy Ebner	Australia
Regional Coordinator – Southeast Asia	Masuo Amano	Japan
Regional Coordinator – Southern Asia	Harivallabh Parikh	India

=== 1980-1982 ===
==== Executive Committee ====
Position	Name	Group
President	Graham Thomas	England **
Vice-president	Don Fawcett	USA **
General Secretary	Barbara Whitehead	England
Assistant General Secretary	Denise Waech	Switzerland
Peace Secretary	Reva King	USA
Editor SI News	Rosalind Schama	England
Treasurer	Denise Waech	Switzerland

==== Regional Coordinators ====
Position	Name	Group
Africa	Lydia Jones	USA
Southern Asia	Harivallabh Parikh	India
Southeast Asia	Kunio Tanaka	Japan
South Pacific	Nan Smith	
RSouth America	Jorge Zoppolo	Uruguay
North America&Caribbean	Kay Lazarus	
Europe & Near East	Antonio Fried	Germany

=== 1983-1985 ===
==== Executive Committee ====
Position	Name	Group
President	Don Fawcett	USA
Vice-president	Maria Soresina	Italy
General Secretary	Kay Lazaruz	USA
Treasurer	Peter Brock	Germany
Peace Secretary	Jo Graham	USA
Assistant General Secretary	Lino Bugeja	Malta

==== Committees and Officers ====
Position	Name	Group
Editor, SI News	Janine Hall	France
Regional Coordinator – Africa	Zeru Michael	
Regional Coordinator – SE Asia	Takashi Aoki	Japan
Regional Coordinator – N America & Caribbean	Rodrigue Aristide	Guadeloupe
Regional Coordinator – Europe & Near East	Antonie Fried	West Germany
Regional Coordinator – Southern Asia	Harivallabh Parikh	India
Regional Coordinator – South Pacific	Nan Smith	Australia
Coordinator – South America	Jorge Zoppolo	Uruguay

=== 1986-1989 ===
==== Executive Committee ====
Position	Name	Group
President	Don Fawcett	USA
Vice-president	Duncan Meikle	Canada
General Secretary	Antonie Fried	Germany
Asst. General Secretary	Yvonne Brown	New Zealand
Treasurer	Peter Brock	Germany

==== Committees and Officers ====
Position	Name	Group
Editor SI Newsletter	Frede Asgaard	Denmark
Area Coordinator – Europe	Ulla Offer	Germany
Area Coordinator – Africa	E.K. Narter-Olaga	Ghana
Area Coordinator – East Asia	Takashi Aoki	Japan
Area Coordinator – South Asia	Harivallabh Parikh	India
Area Coordinator – South Pacific	Tom & Annie Young	New Zealand
Area Coordinator – Central America & Caribbean	Felix Zurita Achoa	Mexico
Area Coordinator – South America	Jorge Zoppolo	Uruguay
Co-opted Members	Reva King	USA
Co-opted Members	Maria Soresina	Italy
Co-opted Members	Barbara Whitehead	England

=== 1989-1992 ===
==== Executive Committee ====
Position	Name	Group
President	Bob Luitweiler	USA
Vice-president	Janos Kurucz	Hungary
Treasurer	Hazel Barham	UK
International Co-ordinator	Antonie Fried	Germany
Host Co-ordinator	Judy Ross	USA
Peace Secretary	Felix Zurita	Mexico
Asian Member	Harivallabh Parikh	India
Latin American Member	Jorge Zoppolo	Uruguay
African Member	E.K. Narter-Olaga	Ghana

=== 1992-1995 ===
==== Executive Committee ====
Position	Officer	Group
President	Ray Scott	New Zealand
Vice-president	Jorge Zoppolo	Uruguay
International Secretary	Vibeke Matorp	Denmark
Assistant Secretary	Maringela Brunello	Italy
Peace Secretary	Harivallabh Parikh	india
Treasurer	Hazel Barham	UK

=== 1995-1998 ===
==== Executive Committee ====
Position	Officer	Group
President	Chris Slader	UK
Vice-president	Jenny Durand	France
General Secretary	Vibeke Matorp	Denmark
Assistant General Secretary	Mariangela Brunello	Italy
Peace Secretary	Daniele Passalacqua	Italy
Treasurer	Hazel Barham	UK

=== 1998-2001 ===
==== Executive Committee ====
Position	Officer	Group
President	Chris Slader	UK
Vice-president	Bertrand Bailleul	France
General Secretary	Kevin Newham	Australia
Assistant General Secretary and Host List Co-ordinator	Claudia Pinto	Brazil
Peace Secretary	Daniele Passalacqua	Italy
Treasurer	Gilbert Revault	France

==== Officers ====
Servas International Newsletter Editor Sharon Beldon, Netherlands

=== 2001-2004 ===
==== Executive Committee ====
Position	Officer	Group
SI President	Roger Martin	Norway
SI Vice-president	Bibendra Pradhananga	Nepal
SI General Secretary	Frits Stuurman	Netherlands
SI Host List Coordinator	Laura Ragucci	Argentina
SI Peace Secretary	Marco Kappenberger	Samoa
SI Treasurer	Gyöngyver Kudor	Hungary

==== Committees and Officers ====
Position	Name	Group
SI Treasurers (Audit) Committee	Markus Kappenburger	Germany
	Alex Dali	Singapore
	Gustavo Molina	Bolivia
	Colette Marteau	France
	Mineswar Sibsurun	Mauritius
SI Appeals Committee	Don Fawcett	USA
	Marisa Contini	Uruguay
	Davis Asher	UK
SI Development Fund Committee	Vibeke Matorp	Denmark
	Mullai Pathy	Singapore
	Abhay Shaha	India
	Mohammed Nasseem	Pakistan
	David Roll	Colombia
SI Complaints Committee	Marisa Contini	Uruguay
	Don Fawcett	USA
	David Asher	UK
SI Nominations Committee	Gwyn Grace	Ireland
	Thawamani (Jini) Subramanianl	Malaysia
	Dafi Galad	Israel
	Changxian Yi	China
	Giuliana Pellizzari	Italy
SI Job Descriptions Committee	Gustavo Molina	Bolivia
	Michael Karris	Italy
	Adela Montes	Guatemala

=== 2004-2006 ===
==== Executive Committee ====
Position	Officer	Group
SI President	Geoff Maltby	Australia
SI Vice-president	Bibendra Pradhananga	Nepal
SI General Secretary	Honora Clemens	USA
SI Host List Coordinator	Claudio Pacchiega	Italy
SI Peace Secretary	Gary Sealey	Canada
SI Treasurer	Ömer Özkan	Turkey

==== Committees and Officers ====
Position	Name	Group
Youth project officers appointment	Ann Greenough	UK
	Pablo Chufeni	Argentina
Nomination Committee	Frits Stuurman	Netherlands
	Anita Kabberman	Uruguay
	Dafi Gilad	Canada

=== 2006-2009 ===
==== Executive Committee ====
Position	Officer	Group
SI President	Gary Sealey	Canada
SI Vice-president	Mary Jane Mikuriya	USA
SI General Secretary	Pramod Kumar	India
SI Host List Coordinator	Anna Flammini	Italy
SI Peace Secretary	Nande Palihakkara	Sri Lanka
SI Treasurer	Ömer Özkan	Turkey

==== Committees and Officers ====
Position	Officer	Group
SI Audit Committee	Miroslav Wasilevski	Poland,
	Rita Torsvik	Norway,
	Florentio Gomez	Venezuela,
	L.V.Subramanian	India
SI Development Fund Committee	Laura Ragucci	Argentina
	Judy Sheldon	Canada
	Michael Johnson	Canada
	Sercan Duygan	Turkey
Youth Project Coordinator	Ann Greenhough	UK

=== 2009-2012 ===
==== Executive Committee ====
Position	Officer	Group
SI President	Gary Sealey	Canada
SI Vice-president	Pramod Kumar	India
SI General Secretary	Penny Pattison	Canada
SI Host List Coordinator	Pablo Colangelo	Argentina
SI Peace Secretary	Kim Jong Soo	South Korea
SI Treasurer	Miroslaw Wasilewski	Poland

==== Committees and Officers ====
Position	Officer	Group
SI Development Committee	Aneris Cao	Argentina
	Luisa Corbetta	Italy
	Judith Shotten	Israel
	Sally Lee	Malaysia
	Mary Jane Mikuriya	USA
SI Finance Committee	L. V. Subramanian	India
	Jonny Sågänger	Sweden
	Phyllis Chinn	USA
SI Conflict Resolution Committee	Julie Dotsch	Canada
	Daryl Chinn	USA
	Luigi Uslenghi	Italy
SI Nominations Committee	Ann Greenough	United Kingdom
	Sylvia Krogh	Canada
	Anna Flammini	Italy
SI Newsletter Editor	Almery Tessarolo and her team	Argentina
SI Archivist	Grant Barnes	USA
SI Youth Development Officer	Magiari Diaz Diaz	Venezuela
SI Youth Coordinator	Pablo Chufeni	Argentina
SI Job Description/Statutes Committee	Noreen Mirza	Pakistan
	Chris Jones	Canada
SI Distant Vote Administrator	Chris Patterson	New Zealand

=== 2012-2015 ===
==== Executive Committee ====
Position	Officer	Group
SI President	Jonny Sågänger	Sweden
SI Vice-president	Ann Greenhough	UK
SI General Secretary	Jaime Alberto Romero	Colombia
SI Host List Coordinator	Arnoud Philippo	Netherlands
SI Peace Secretary	Danielle Serres	France
SI Treasurer	Miroslaw Wasilewski	.Poland

==== Committees and Officers ====
Position	Officer	Group
SI Newsletter Editor	Terry Stone	Greece
SI Distant Vote Administrator	Chris Patterson	New Zealand
SI Archivist	Robert Mitchell	USA
SI Job Descriptions and Statutes Committee	Chris Jones	Canada
	Jack Huang	China
	Alvany Santiago	Brazil
SI Audit Committee	Phyllis Chinn	USA
	LV Subramanian	India
	Emmanuel Kakinda	Uganda
SI Nominations Committee	Norma Nicholson	Australia
	Jean Seymour	UK
	Amir Levy	Israel
SI Conflict Resolution Committee	Julie Dotsch	Canada
	Clare Mateke	Zambia
	Marneo Serenelli	Italy
SI Development Committee	Ewa Dzierżawska	Poland
	Joel Kaloba	Zambia
	Pablo Chufeni	Argentina
	Aneris Cao	Argentina
	Anna Cristina Siragusa	Italy

=== 2015-2018 ===
==== Executive Committee ====
Position	Officer	Group
SI President	Jonny Sågänger	Sweden
SI Vice-president	Ann Greenhough	UK
SI General Secretary	Penny Pattison	Canada
SI Host List Coordinator	Pablo Colangelo	Argentina
SI Peace Secretary	Danielle Serres	France
SI Treasurer	LV Subramanian	India

==== Committees and Officers ====
Committee	Officer	Group
SI Development Committee	Ewa Dzierzawski	Poland
	Fidele Rutayisire	Rwanda
	Kristina Buynova	Russia
	Kiat Yun Tan	Malaysia
	Maria Fernanda Vomero	Brazil
SI Audit Committee	Ashley Burrowes	New Zealand
	Emmanuel Kakinda	Uganda
	Graham Robertson	Australia
SI Archivist	Anna Koster	USA
SI Conflict Resolution Committee	Martin Henner	USA
	Clare Mateke	Zambia
	Alvany Santiago	Brazil
SI Nomination Committee	Dianne Peterson	Singapore
	Susanne Thestrup	Denmark
	Norma Nicholson	Australia
SI Job Descriptions and Statutes Committee	Amir Levy	Israel
	Jack Huang	China
	Chris Jones	Canada
SI Distant Vote Administrator	Chris Patterson	New Zealand
SI Youth Leadership Committee	Susanna Martinez	Spain
	Janek Dzierzawski	Poland
	Karolina Paleckova	Czech Republic
	Asiia Zhakypova	Kyrgyzstan
	Pablo Chufeni	Argentina

=== 2018-2022 ===
==== Executive Committee ====
Position	Officer	Group
SI President	Jonny Sågänger	Sweden
SI Vice-president	Carla Kristensen	Portugal
SI General Secretary	Kiat Yun Tan	Malaysia
SI Membership & Technology Secretary	Jim Leask*	Canada
SI Peace Secretary	Paige LaCombe	USA
SI Treasurer	Radha B. Radhakrishna	USA

==== Committees and Officers ====
Position	Name	Group
SI Internal Audit Committee	L V Subramanian	India
	Phyllis Chinn	USA
	Gülsen Elyak	Turkey
SI Development Committee	Lilly Kerekes Beltran	Mexico
	Ewa Dzierzawska	Poland
	Fidele Rutayisire	Rwanda
	Pablo Colangelo	Argentina
	Pamela Yang	Taiwan
SI Youth and Families Committee	Susana Martinez	Spain
	Raffaella Rota	Italy
	Natasha Noreen	Italy
	Aneris Cao	Chile
	Mar Ferre	Spain
SI Distant Vote Administrator	Chris Patterson	New Zealand

=== 2022-2025 ===
Elected General Assembly in 2022 in Panchgani, India

==== Executive Committee ====
Position	Officer	Group
SI President	Radha B. Radhakrishna	USA
SI Vice-president	Carla Kristensen	Portugal
SI General Secretary	Jonny Sågänger	Sweden
SI Membership & Technology Secretary	Paul Nielsen	Australia
SI Peace Secretary	Francisco Luna	Mexico
SI Treasurer	Suresh Jain	India

==== Committees and Officers ====
Position	Name	Group
SI Distant Vote Administrator (SI DVA)	Craig Melrose	Australia
SI Internal Audit Committee (SI IAC)	Yukiko Namariyama	Japan
	Gülşen Elyak	Turkey
	Ana Rita Gama	Portugal
SI Development Committee (SI DC)	Pamela Yang	Taiwan
	Evren Özkan	Turkey
	Neuma Dantas	Brazil
	Jamie Robertson	UK
	Bhudeb Chakravarti	India
SI Youth and Families Committee (SI YFC)	Bogdan Ionescu	Romania
	Elena Olivera Begué	Spain
	Mehmet Ateş	Turkey
	Raffaella Rota	Italy
	Hiren Goradia	India

=== 2025-2028 ===
Elected Officers at General Assembly in 2025 in Dijon, France

==== Executive Committee ====
Position	Name	Group
SI President	Radha Radhakrishna	USA
SI Vice President	Carla Kristensen	Portugal
SI Treasurer	Gülşen Elyak	Germany
SI General Secretary	Kent Machaulay	Canada
Peace Secretary	Francisco Salomon Luna Aburto	Mexico
SI Membership and Technology Secretary	Paul Nielsen	Australia

==== Committees and Officers ====
Position	Name	Group
SI Development Committee	Pamela Yang	Taiwan
	Jamie Robertson	England and Ireland
	Tatjana Negi	Germany
	Neuma Dantas	Brazil
	Moses Kigozi	Uganda
SI Youth and Families Committee	Elena Olvera Reyes (Resigned)	Spain
	Mehmet Ates	Turkey
	Mehmet Akif Yegin	England and Ireland
	David Leonard Kabambo	Tanzania
	Buhadeb Chakravarti	India
SI Internal Audit Committee	Salvador Da Matta	Brazil
	Richard Wolfe	USA
	Koray Yesilada (Appointed bt SI Exco)	Turkey
SI Conflict Resolution Committee	Richard Weaver	USA
	Francisco Dominguez González	Spain
SI Distant Vote Administrator	Pramod Kumar	India
