= Hospitality Club =

Hospitality exchange service

- Area served: Global
- Owner: Veit Kühne
- Founder: Veit Kühne
- Products: Homestay
- Services: Social networking service
- Launched: July 11, 2000; 26 years ago
- Current status: Offline

Hospitality Club (HC) was a hospitality exchange service (a gift economy network for finding homestays whereby hosts were not allowed to charge for lodging) accessible via a website. HC's specified goals were to facilitate "intercultural understanding ... bringing people together ... travelers and locals".

== History ==
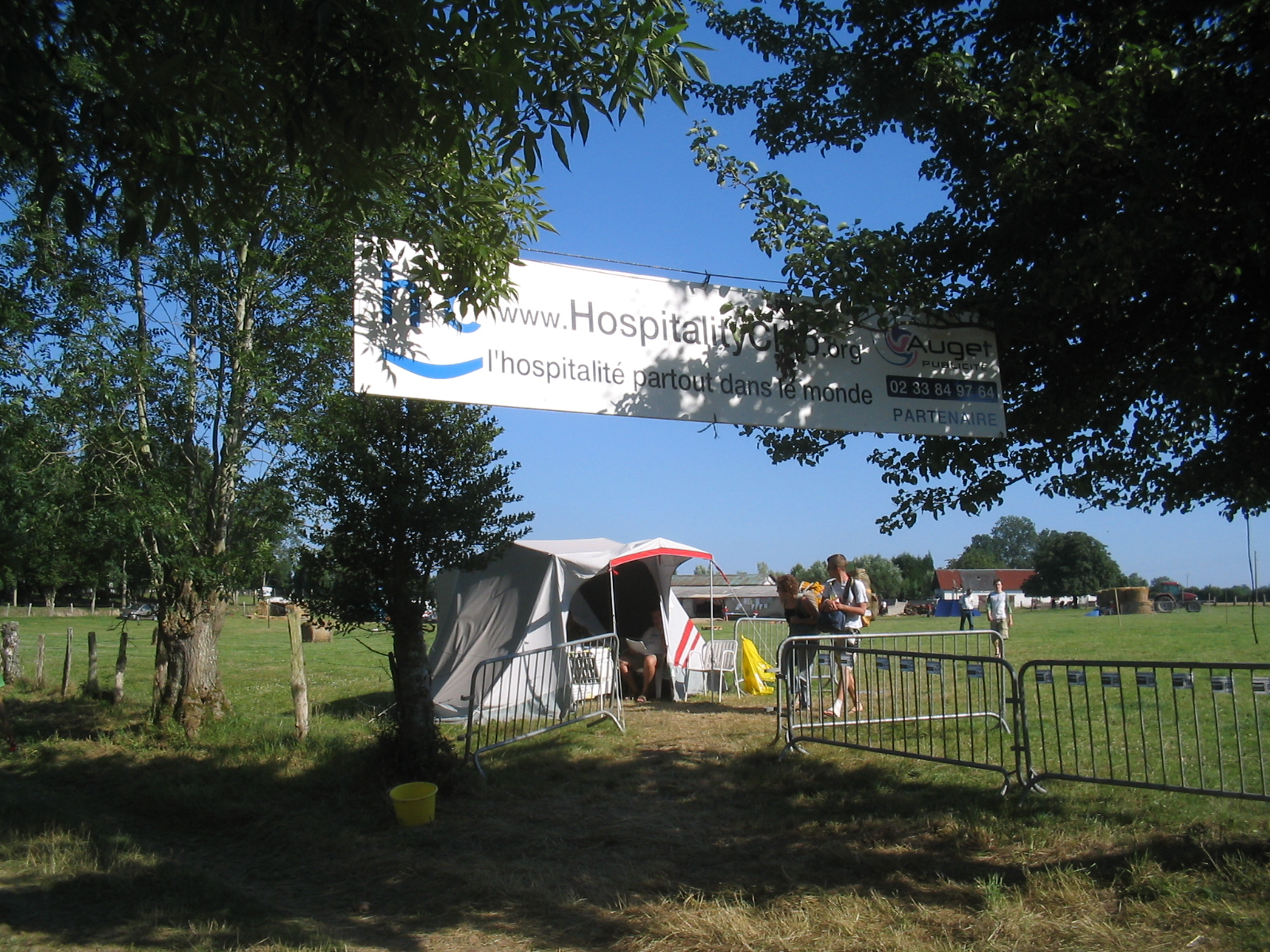
Hospitality Club banner; taken in July 2005 in Monnai, France.

Hospitality Club was founded in July 2000 in Koblenz, by Veit Kühne, who was inspired by a trip to South America. It later incorporated technology from Hospex.org, a similar service.

In 2005, a disagreement between some members of Hospitality Club and its founder led to the foundation of BeWelcome. Many HC members, who became volunteers within Couchsurfing, left HC towards CS because of its missing legal status and insufficient management transparency.

In February 2006, Kühne was working full-time on Hospitality Club. In the spring of 2006, an event took place in Riga with 430 participants from 36 countries.

As of July 2006, the site had 155,000 members. This number grew by around 1,000 new members a week in 2006.

In 2007, Google Trends search volume for hospitalityclub.org started to decline and was overtaken by the search volume for CouchSurfing.

In 2008, HC had more than 400,000 members from 200 countries.

In 2013, HC had more than a half of million members from 200 countries.

By 2017, only one third of members were still active.

By April 2022, the website was completely offline.

== Safety measures ==
Hospitality Club had a reputation system, whereby members left references for others. For added safety, members were encouraged to check each other's passports, although it rarely happened.
