= Daniel Hoffer =

American entrepreneur

- Born: Brookline, Massachusetts United States
- Citizenship: American
- Education: Harvard University (AB); Columbia University (MBA)
- Occupations: Entrepreneur, executive, venture capitalist
- Known for: Co-founder and former CEO of CouchSurfing; Managing Director at Autotech Ventures

Daniel Hoffer is an American entrepreneur and venture capitalist, known for his role as Co-Founder and previous Chief Executive Officer (CEO) of the hospitality exchange service, CouchSurfing. Presently, Hoffer serves as Co-Founder and Managing Partner of Deep Venture Partners which is an early stage venture capital fund, and immediately prior to that role worked as Senior Vice President, Corporate Development at technology startup Hayden AI, a Series C stage startup backed by TPG.

== Background ==
Daniel Hoffer was raised in Brookline and started his first dot-com company at age 15. Since 1990 he has been actively involved in various Internet-related communities and businesses . While in high school, Hoffer managed an online Bulletin Board System and an educational program designed to connect physically-challenged individuals with their peers in a digital environment.

Hoffer earned an A.B. degree in Philosophy from Harvard University and an MBA from Columbia University.

== Career ==
Hoffer co-founded Fuxito Worldwide, a venture-backed soccer website, where he hired Casey Fenton and Sebastien Letuan in 1999. Representing the company, he was featured on the cover of Inc. Magazine in January 2000.

Hoffer's professional experience includes roles as a strategist at NEC Corporation, in sales at Siebel Systems, and in product management at Symantec. He later served at Concur (prior to its acquisition by SAP for $8.3B) as Head of Product for TripIt (and its associated product lines) and Head of Product for ExpenseIt.

=== CouchSurfing ===
CouchSurfing was co-founded by Hoffer, Sebastian Letuan, and Casey Fenton. The company was initially registered as a non-profit in 2003. Hoffer served as CouchSurfing's Chief Operating Officer during its non-profit phase, as well as Chairman of the Board.

In 2010, after the Internal Revenue Service (IRS) denied CouchSurfing's application for 501(c)(3) tax-exempt status, Hoffer assumed the role of CEO. He subsequently joined Benchmark Capital as an Entrepreneur-in-Residence and transitioned CouchSurfing into a for-profit certified B corporation.

In 2011, under Hoffer's leadership, CouchSurfing raised $7.6 million in Series A venture capital funding, led by Benchmark Capital with participation from Point Nine Capital, Gil Penchina, Michael Birch, and others. Subsequently in 2012 CouchSurfing raised a $15 million Series B financing round from General Catalyst, Menlo Ventures, Benchmark Capital and other investors.

=== Other Ventures ===
In 2015, Hoffer became a Partner at Tandem Capital, a seed venture capital fund based in Silicon Valley. Later, in 2018, he was appointed as a part-time General Partner at Speedinvest, an Austrian venture capital fund.

After Tandem Capital, Hoffer joined Autotech Ventures as a Managing Director, where he was involved in the company's investments in SWVL, a private transit start-up with headquarters in Dubai and Cairo that later went public on Nasdaq; BusUp, a shuttle platform in Barcelona; and Bus.com, a charter bus service in Montreal. These ventures in the bus industry, along with his subsequent senior executive role at Autotech Ventures portfolio company Hayden AI, have led to Hoffer being nicknamed "The Bus King." Hoffer left Autotech Ventures in July 2023 to join on a full-time basis Hayden AI, an Autotech Ventures portfolio company with whom he had worked closely.

Hoffer has made early stage angel investments in many high profile startups including Beanworks (acquired by Quadient), Branch, Firefly, Fishbowl (acquired by Glassdoor), Grove Collaborative (NYSE: GROV), Hayden AI, LoungeBuddy (acquired by American Express), Outdoorsy, and Trucklabs (acquired by Conmet). In 2017, Hoffer participated as an angel investor in the $30 million funding round for SpotHero, an online parking marketplace. In 2020, he was also involved in the $10 million funding round for Preply, an online learning platform.

Hoffer has shared his expertise as a guest lecturer at institutions such as Harvard Business School, Stanford Graduate School of Business, Kellogg School of Management, Columbia Business School and UC Berkeley Haas School of Business.

== Personal life ==
Hoffer has contributed articles to Forbes and TechCrunch. In his leisure time, he is a licensed martial arts instructor. Hoffer currently resides in Menlo Park, California.

== Board roles ==
- BusUp (Director)
- Citian (Director)
- CouchSurfing International (Director)
- Drover (acquired by Cazoo) (Director)
- Klearnow.ai (Observer)
- Marti (IPO) (Observer)
- Masonhub (Director)
- Mode Mobile (Director)
- Mundimoto (Director)
- Pickup (acquired by PointPickup) (Observer)
- SWVL (IPO) (Observer)
- TripLingo (acquired by Travel and Transport) (Director)
- Trucklabs (acquired by ConMet) (Director)
