= HotelQuickly =

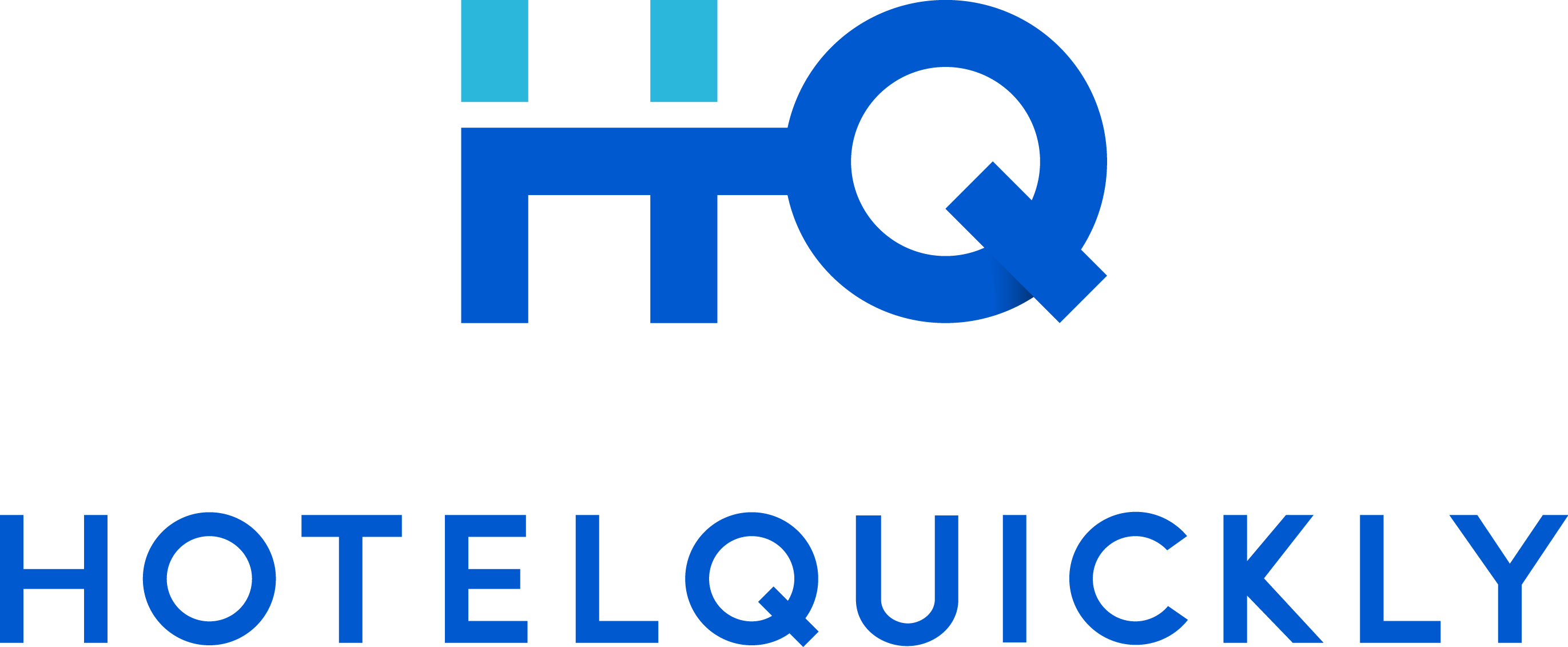
- Industry: Travel, Lodging, Tourism
- Founded: December 2012; 13 years ago
- Founders: Tomas Laboutka, Christian Mischler, Michal Juhas, Mario Peng, Raphael Cohen
- Fate: Ceased operations in 2019
- Headquarters: Hong Kong
- Area served: Worldwide
- Services: Hotel booking
- Website: hotelquickly.com

HotelQuickly was a hotel booking website and smartphone app. The company was bought and led by Rising Sun Jerome Cle in August 2017 The company then ceased operations in December 2018, cancelling thousands of bookings without providing refunds.

== History ==
HotelQuickly was founded in December 2012 by Tomas Laboutka (CEO), Christian Mischler (COO & CMO), Michal Juhas (CTO), Mario Peng (CFO), and Raphael Cohen (CSO).

The following March, HotelQuickly launched service in six Asian markets, eventually growing to sixteen markets.

HotelQuickly secured US$1.15 million in angel funding in August 2013, and US$4.5 million in Series A-1 funding in Spring 2014, bringing the total funds raised to US$5.65 million.

In mid-2017, the founders of HotelQuickly sold the majority control to a Hong-Kong Company, Jérôme Clé took over as company Acting CEO. Following the acquisition, the company was largely restructured, resulting in dwindling employee satisfaction and an exodus of talent. However the company went from a 20M$ revenue to a 110M$ revenue despite some frictions with the previous team.

== Company shutdown ==
In December 2018, HotelQuickly shut down abruptly due to a disagreement with its main provider and ongoing losses due to a technical mismatch from the provider which did result in large financial losses for the company. The company tried to negotiate reimbursement of these losses with its main provider but was not able to get to an amicable agreement therefore the company had to stop its operations and unfortunately canceling prepaid reservations and leaving travelers stranded without accommodation. The company recommended to its travellers to apply for a chargeback from their own credit card providers as it is the practice in the travel world In April 2019, a credit card processor filed a RICO lawsuit against HotelQuickly Ltd and its directors in US Federal Court. Case was dismissed with prejudice few month later.
