= Hospitality exchange service =

Social networking services where hosts do not receive payments

Hospitality exchange services (hospitality exchange platforms, hospitality exchange networks or HospEx) are social networking services used for accommodation of travellers, where hosts do not receive payments. The relationships on hospitality exchange services are shaped by altruism and are related to the cyber-utopianism on the Web in its beginnings and to utopia in general.

On HospEx, members typically create public profiles that describe themselves and their travel plans, and then searching for potential hosts or guests based on various criteria such as location, interests, and availability. Travelers connect with local hosts who are willing to offer free accommodation, meals, and/or other forms of hospitality during their trip. The concept of hospitality exchange has been around for a long time, with informal networks of travelers and hosts existing for decades. However, the advent of the internet and social media has made it much easier to connect with people from all over the world, and hospitality exchange networks have become increasingly popular as a way for people to avoid commercial tourism and experience local cultures in a more authentic way. These networks are usually non-profit, registered under .org-domains, built up by volunteers and use open-source software.

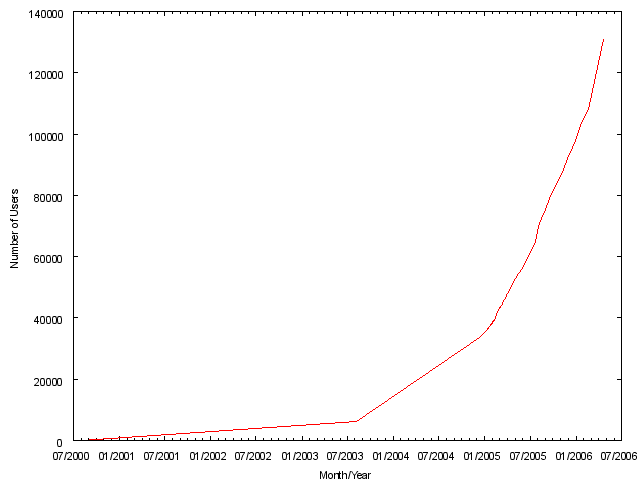
The number of users on Hospitality Club in the years 2000 to 2006.

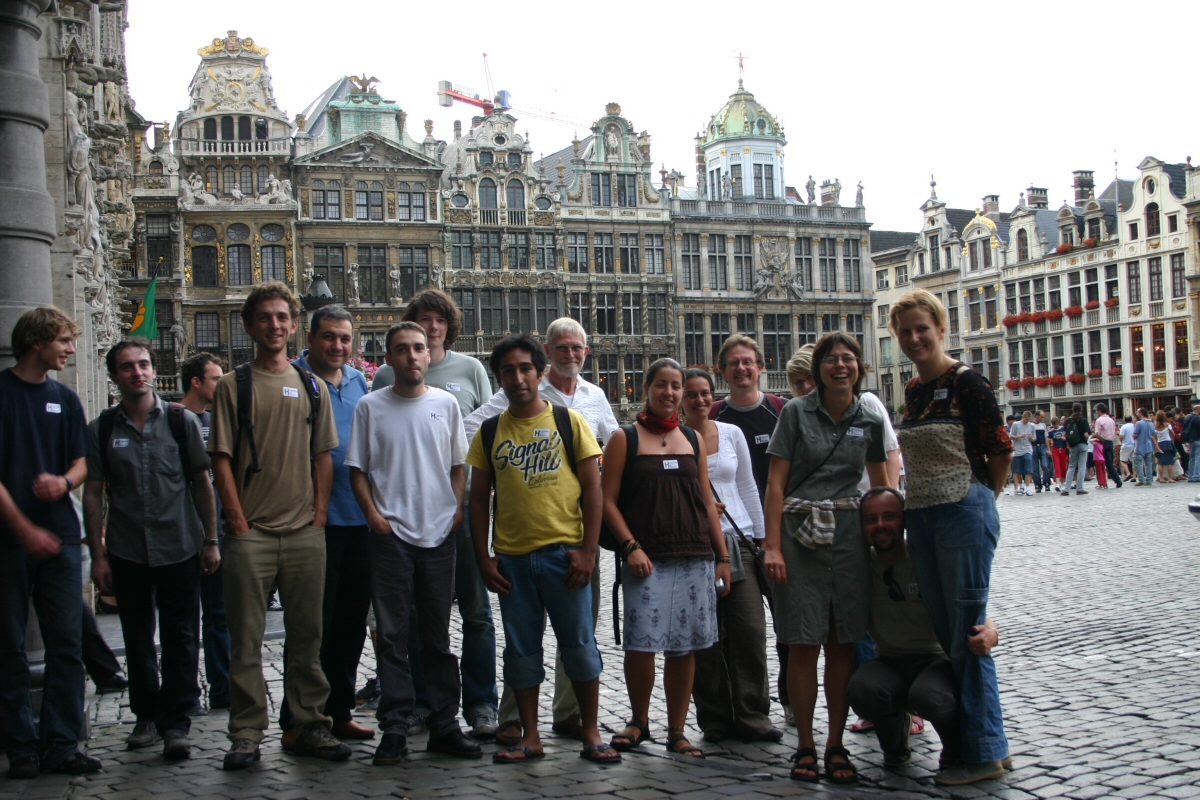
Hospex members in Brussels in 2008

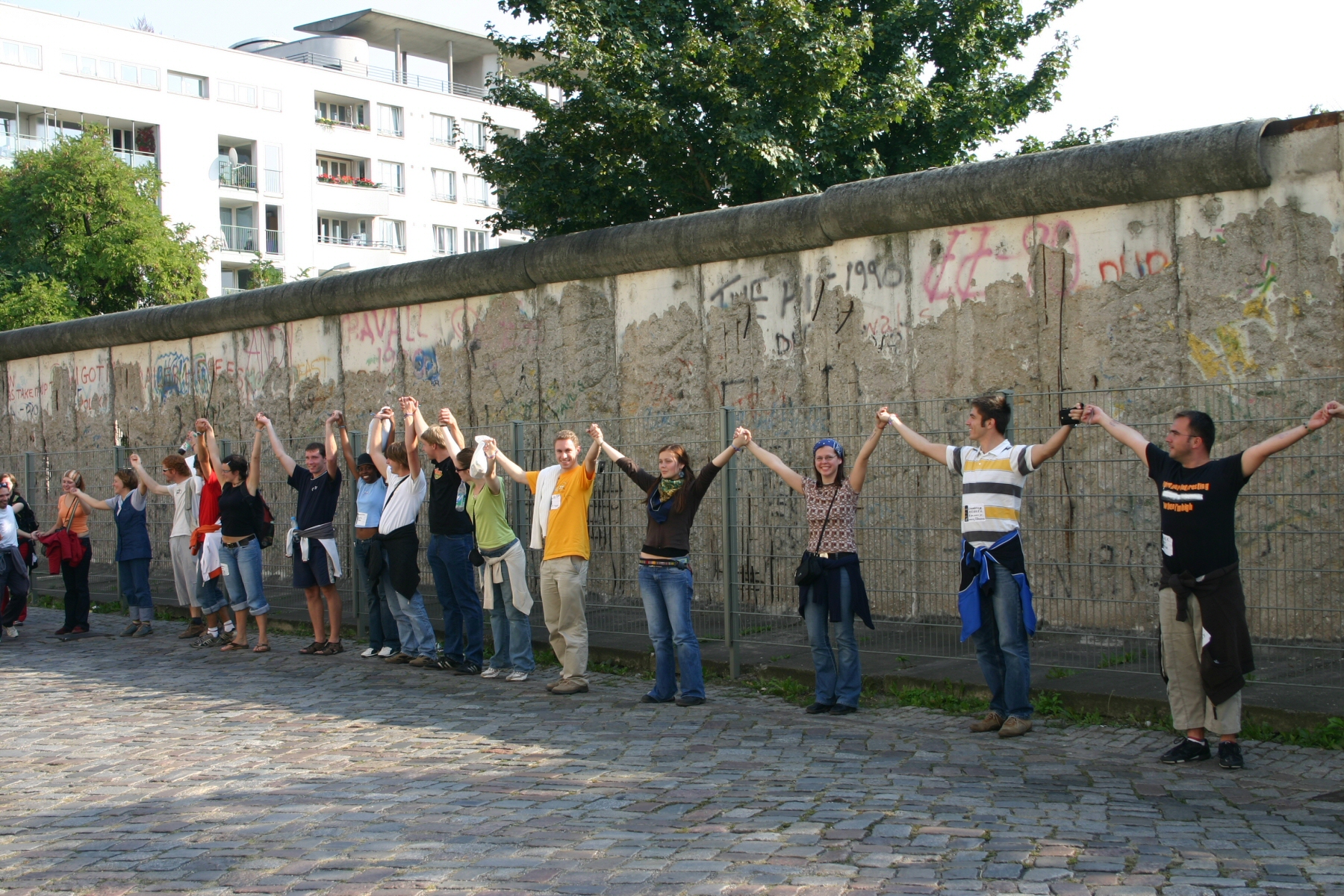
The picture was taken in front of the Berlin Wall during the Berlin Beach Camp (an annual gathering of all the Hospex communities) in 2008.

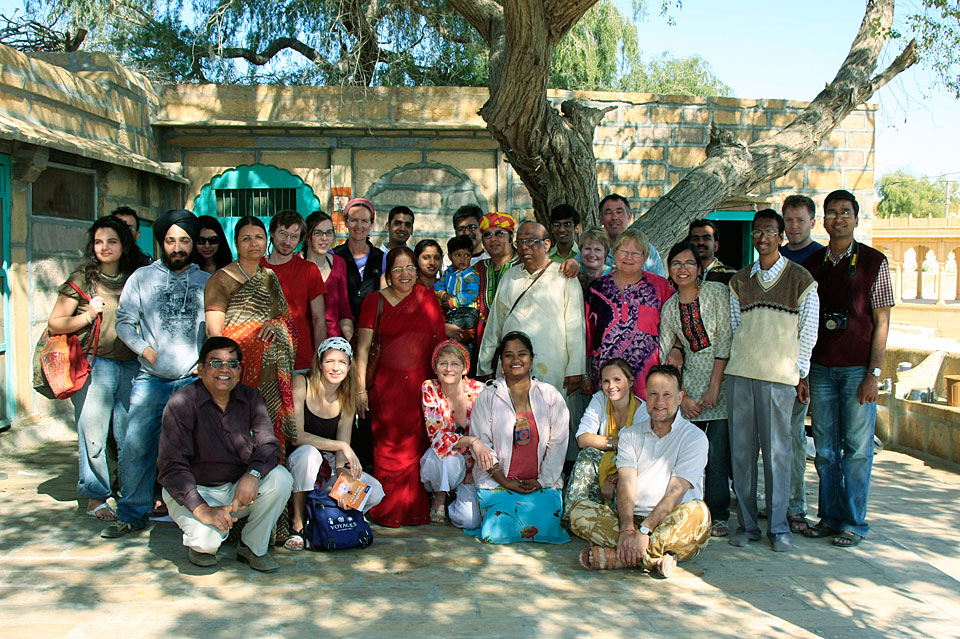
Couchsurfing meeting in 2009

== Uniqueness ==
The biggest HospEx platform in 2012, "CouchSurfing appears to fulfil the original utopian promise of the Internet to unite strangers across geographical and cultural divides and to form a global community". CouchSurfing used utopian rhetoric of "better world," "sharing cultures," and of much better access to global flows and networks of all sorts. It was featured as a means to achieve a cosmopolitan utopia. Commodification of CouchSurfing terminated "the existence of a project run as a flourishing commons, a cyber-utopian dream come true; an example of genuine exchange outside and free from the dominant logic of capital, a space highlighting cultural instead of monetary values, understanding instead of commerce. This space still exists, but instead of outside, now within the market." After CouchSurfing became a for-profit corporation in 2011, some members urged others to join BeWelcome. Many volunteers, who had become brand ambassadors of CouchSurfing, left to BeWelcome and other non-profit platforms because of the change in legal status and insufficient management transparency.

Non-profit hospitality exchange services have offered scientists access to their anonymized data for publication of research on trust and cooperation. Before becoming for-profit, CouchSurfing offered four research teams access to its social networking data. In 2015, non-profit hospitality exchange services Bewelcome and Warm Showers also provided their data for public research.

== Notable hospitality exchange services ==
Name	Non-profit?	Year founded	Notes
BeWelcome	Yes	2007	BeWelcome (BW) is a non-profit, open-source hospitality exchange service accessible via the BeWelcome website or Android app. BeWelcome is operated by BeVolunteer, a nonprofit organization organized as a voluntary association registered in Rennes, Brittany, France, which is composed solely of volunteers. Membership in BeWelcome is motivated by the absence of for-profit pressure, democratic decision making, and a strict privacy policy. The site had 234,000 users as of March 2023, across 216 countries. BeWelcome was formed by members of Hospitality Club who had had a disagreement with its founder.
Couchers	Yes	2020	Couchers was founded by Aapeli Vuorinen and Itsi Weinstock during COVID-19 lockdowns and in response to CouchSurfing introducing a paywall to its site. Couchers, Inc. is a 501(c)(3) non-profit organization incorporated in the State of Florida in the United States and operates the Couchers.org service and project. The platform is built and maintained completely by volunteers and includes a clause which prohibits ever turning into a for-profit corporation. It attempts to tackle issues in CouchSurfing such as "super hosts", safety concerns and technical bloat.
CouchSurfing	No	2004	Casey Fenton founded CouchSurfing, where free accommodation can be offered. In 2011, Couchsurfing, previously a non-profit, was turned into a for-profit corporation. Members in some developed countries pay a monthly subscription fee. The conversion of the biggest of hospitality exchange service, Couchsurfing, to a for-profit corporation in 2011 was objected to by many of its members. This was an instance of commodification. CouchSurfing had previously been financed by donations and built using volunteer work.
Dachgeber	Yes	1987	Wolfgang Reiche founded a non-profit German hospitality exchange service for cyclists within ADFC.
Friendship Force International	Yes	1977	Presbyterian minister Wayne Smith and U.S. President Jimmy Carter established Friendship Force International, with the mission of improving intercultural relations, cultural diplomacy, friendship, and intercultural competence via organized trips involving homestays.
Hospitality Club (defunct)	Unknown	1992	Hospex.org was launched online; it later was folded into Hospitality Club, which was created in 2000 by Veit Kühne.
Pasporta Servo	Yes	1974	Pasporta Servo facilitates free lodging for Esperanto speakers and was established from the work of psychologist Rubén Feldman González in Argentina. Access to the service and lodging are free; however, some hosts may request reimbursement of food costs.
Servas International	Yes	1949	Servas International is a volunteer-run international nonprofit organization advocating interracial and international peace. People wishing to join SERVAS must supply letters of recommendation and be interviewed to ensure that they understand the purpose and protocol of being a Servas member, whether as a traveller or host. Members pay an annual fee to the organization, which is determined locally by country.
SportsHosts (defunct)	Unknown	2016	SportsHosts was a community platform that connected traveling sports fans with local hosts to attend live sporting events.
Traveler's Directory (defunct)	Yes	1965	John Wilcock set up the Traveler's Directory as a listing of his friends willing to host each other when traveling. In 1988, Joy Lily rescued the organization from imminent shutdown, forming Hospitality Exchange.
Travel Ladies	No	2021	Travel Ladies is a free, women-only hospitality exchange.
Trustroots	Yes	2014	In 2014, Trustroots was founded by Kasper Souren and Mikael Korpela in Berlin, Germany. Trustroots.org is a non-profit hospitality exchange service featuring “circles” for hitchhikers, cyclists, buskers, train hoppers, vegans and vegetarians, climbers and others. In 2020, Trustroots had 44,000 members, from 220 countries. In May 2022, the non-profit Trustroots Foundation was dissolved. In June 2026, Trustroots reached 139,000 members.
Warm Showers	Yes	1993	Warm Showers is a non-profit homestay platform for traveling cyclists. It has over 173,000 members, including 114,000 hosts. Registration requires payment of a one-time $30 registration fee.
