= ThirdHome =

- Website type: Privately held company
- Founded: 2010 in Brentwood, Tennessee, United States
- Headquarters: Brentwood, Tennessee
- Area served: Worldwide
- Founder: Wade Shealy
- Key people: Wade Shealy (CEO and Chairman); (Partner and President)
- Products: Homestay; Home exchange
- Employees: 45 (2017)
- Website: www.thirdhome.com

ThirdHome is a global home exchange service, specializing in luxury properties, founded by Wade Shealy in 2010. With its headquarters in Brentwood, Tennessee, United States, the company operates internationally, positioning itself uniquely to cater exclusively to owners of second homes.

== Overview ==
ThirdHome positions itself as an exclusive home exchange club for luxury second-home owners. The club has more than 20,500 properties across 100 countries. In this club, members can exchange unused weeks at their vacation homes with other members.

This exchange earns members travel credits that they can use to stay at other properties listed in the club. Available accommodations range from castles, villas, and estates to resorts and yachts.

== Operational model ==
ThirdHome primarily focuses on luxurious secondary homes, rather than primary residences, for exchanges. Members earn credits, termed "Keys", when they make their properties available for exchange. These keys offer members the flexibility to choose when and where to travel, eliminating the need for a simultaneous exchange with another member.

ThirdHоmе describes itsеlf аs аn upscаlе hоmе еxchаngе cоmmunity еxclusivе tо sеcоnd-hоmе оwnеrs. Unlikе оthеr sеrvicеs which аdmit primаry rеsidеncеs, ThirdHоmе's mеmbеrship is rеstrictеd tо individuаls with sеcоndаry rеsidеncеs.

ThirdHоmе has also formed pаrtnеrships with rеsоrt аnd rеsidеncе club brаnds.

== Company history ==
ThirdHome was founded by Wade Shealy, who had previously co-founded a successful real estate firm in South Carolina in 1986. Shealy noticed a pattern among his clients who purchased second homes—they often wished to sell their properties within five years, citing a lack of new experiences in their vacation location. Inspired by this, Shealy founded ThirdHome in 2010 with a small group of friends and clients as the initial members.

In 2018, the company expanded its services with the introduction of Rentals and Adventures, broadening the travel experiences available to members.

As of 2025, ThirdHome has over 20,500 properties across 100 countries.
