= Warm Showers =

Non-profit hospitality exchange service for touring cyclists

- Company type: 501(c)(3) organization non-profit organization
- Area served: Global
- Owners: Warmshowers.org Foundation (as on the website); WARMSHOWERS ORG (as filed in the IRS form)
- Founders: Terry Zmrhal; Geoff Cashmen
- Key people: Lance Bickford, chairman Jerry Kopack, treasurer
- Products: Homestay
- Services: Social networking service, Communication
- Website: www.warmshowers.org
- Users: 161,000 members; including 104,000 hosts in 161 countries
- Launched: 1993; 33 years ago

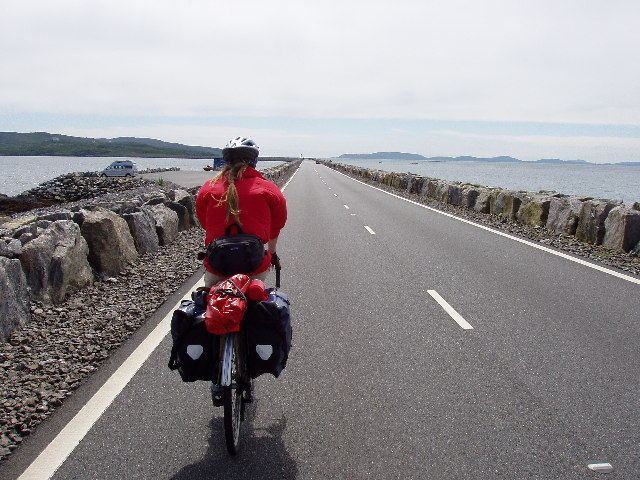
Cycle touring over the Eriskay - South Uist causeway

Warm Showers (WS) is a non-profit hospitality exchange service and support network for people engaging in bicycle touring, whereby members offer each other free lodging, meals, and support. It is operated by WARMSHOWERS ORG, a Colorado 501(c)(3) nonprofit organization headquartered in Boulder, Colorado, US. It is accessible via a website and mobile app.

The platform has been described as a "cyclists’ support network whose members may offer free amenities and services such as meals and lodging". Rough Guides recommends Warm Showers as means to improve security of solo female cyclists. Warm Showers helps bicycle travelers to balance the self-reliance of camping and hotels with opportunities for social encounters. Warm Showers has a positive effect on rural communities, both socially and economically. Many users of the platform cycle for health reasons or to be environmentally friendly. Cultural exchange and social connection do also play a role.

== History ==
The concept was inspired by cyclist John Mosley in 1976 by placing an ad in the U.S. magazine Bike World, which requested to sign up for a hospitality list. A list of 800 names and contact info was put into a rolodex for almost 30 years. The name of the organization was Touring Cyclist Hospitality Directory. Mosley provided touring cyclists with copies of pages from the rolodex.

A Canadian couple, Terry Zmrhal and Geoff Cashmen, founded Warm Showers in 1993 as a continuation of Touring Cyclist Hospitality Directory. They created a database from the existing members of biking-hospitality organizations. In 1996, Roger Gravel became responsible for the platform. In 2005, Randy Fay created the website based on the existing database.

== Membership statistics ==
In 2018, 53% of members were based in Europe and 30% in North America.

| Date | Members |
|---|---|
| August 2014 | 50,000 members |
| April 2017 | 89,000; including 39,000 hosts |
| April 2018 | 85,000 members |
| August 2018 | 112,570 |
| October 2019 | 144,000 members in 161 countries |
| April 2021 | 161,000 members; including 104,000 hosts in 161 countries |

== Financials ==
| Year | Revenue / Contributions |
|---|---|
| 2015 | $100,641 |
| 2016 | $84,009 |
| 2017 | $115,324 |
| 2018 | $128,626 |
| 2019 | $111,089 |
| 2020 | $169,837 |
| 2021 | $329,052 |
| 2022 | $459,017 |
| 2023 | $574,715 |
| 2024 | $622,126 |

== Homestay requests ==
Warm Showers grants trustworthy teams of scientists access to its anonymized data for publication of insights to the benefit of humanity. In 2015, an analysis of 97,915 homestay requests from BeWelcome and 285,444 homestay requests from Warm Showers showed general regularity — the less time is spent on writing a homestay request, the lower is the probability of success. Since both networks are shaped by altruism, low-effort communication, aka 'copy and paste requests', evidently sends the wrong signal.
