= Rubén Feldman González =

Argentine physician and psychologist

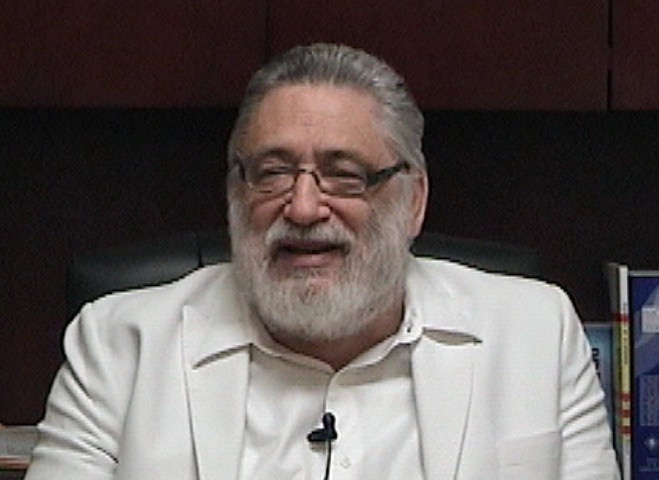
- Rubén Feldman González in his office, circa 2007
- Born: Rubén Ernesto Feldman González; September 27, 1940; Resistencia, Chaco, Argentina
- Died: February 23, 2024 (aged 83); Mexicali, Baja California, Mexico
- Citizenship: Argentine; American; Mexican
- Occupations: physician, surgeon, pediatrician, psychiatrist, neurologist
- Known for: Founder of Holokinetic Psychology, the Esperanto Association in Santa Fe, Argentina, and the Argentine Esperanto Youth Organization (Argentejo)
- Website: percepcionunitaria.org/en

Rubén Ernesto Feldman González (September 27, 1940, Resistencia, Chaco – February 23, 2024, Mexicali B.C.) was an Argentine physician, surgeon, pediatrician, psychiatrist and neurologist, known mainly for his contribution to psychology, having founded holokinetic psychology, as well as his dissemination of the language Esperanto.

He was the author of more than forty books on holokinetic psychology and the human mind, using an approach he calls Unitary Perception.

== Medicine and psychiatry ==
In 1968, he received his medical degree No. 12387 from National University of Rosario. Between 1968 and 1971 Feldman-González served as a pediatrician for the Mapuche natives of Patagonia (Argentina). He then specialized in pediatrics. In the US, Feldman Gonzalez graduated as a Physician and Surgeon in March 1976, Licence No. 36506 in the State of Pennsylvania. He completed a residency in psychiatry in the Warren State Hospital and later in child psychiatry at the University of Miami, where he became an Ad-Honorem Professor in Child Psychiatry for Medical Graduates as Chief of Fellows in Child Psychiatry (1976–1979). In 1980, he became a Graduate of the American Board in Psychiatry and Neurology (ABPN). From 1985 to 1992 he served as a child psychiatrist to a large population in California, mainly for the Coahuila natives and the Chenas of South California and Northern Baja California. Between 1993 and 1998 he served the Athabascan, Eskimo and Inuit natives in Alaska. He carried research about the effects of light and darkness on the human brain, above all on sleep, wakefulness, blood pressure, sex, and alertness. Feldman-González obtained medical licenses in the states of Florida No. 27187/1976. California No. A32502/1978 Indiana No. 01041966/1993 and Alaska No. 3174/1993 and later in México No. 5691038/2014.

== Holokinetic psychology ==
Attempting to simplify his teaching, Rubén Feldman-González said: “The brain is a twelve cylinder engine. We work with a single cylinder for fear of taking off. When two cylinders work at the same time, reality surpasses fantasy and imagination. Let's get together to see this. Let us be permanent apprentices of life."

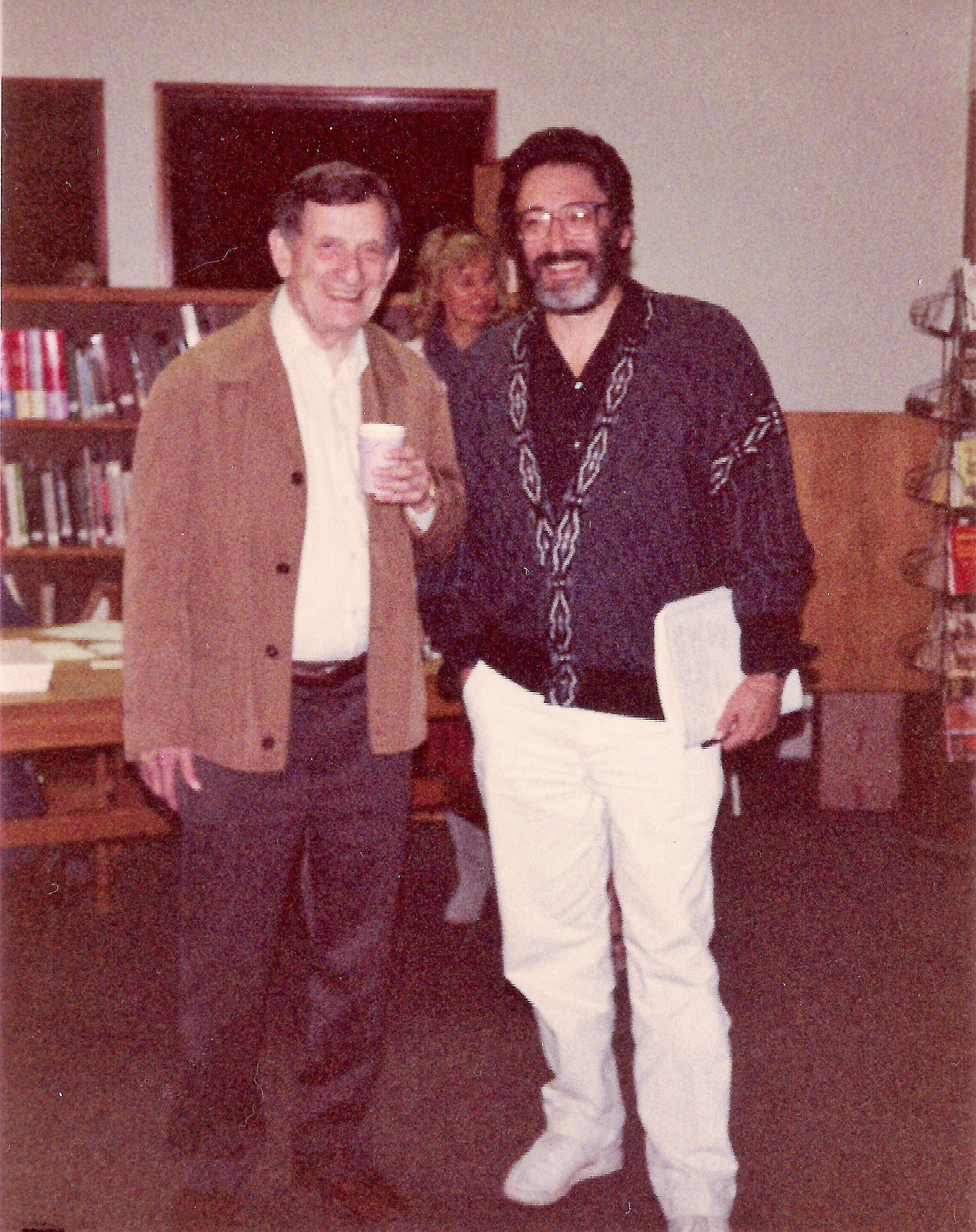
Dr. David Bohm and Dr. Ruben Feldman González in Ojai-California, 1989.

His ideas are said to be rooted in the post-quantic Physics promulgated by physicist David Bohm, with the theory of holokinesis, which states that "reality is not fragmented, not divided". It is also based in Karl Pribram's theory of holographic memory, which states that memory is distributed throughout the brain and not in specific zones or engrams, and in Bell's mathematical theorem.

In 1978, Feldman-González was invited by Bohm to the University of London, England, to lecture on Unitary Perception. They became lifelong friends.

From 1978, Feldman-González travelled periodically around the world to give workshops, conferences, retreats and seminars on the new psychological paradigm he proposed, emphasizing Unitary Perception, which he said was latent brain function with importance for the individual and society. These tours included India, Argentina, Spain, Chile, Colombia, England, Mexico, Ireland, Nicaragua, Peru, Venezuela, China, and Russia.

Rubén Feldman-González published many books, which have been partly translated into English, Portuguese, French, German, and Esperanto.

In 1987 he received the nomination as Professor in Psychology and Psychiatry at the International Academy of Sciences of the Republic of San Marino (IAS-RSM), thanks to his advances in the field of scientific psychology. From 1999 to his death, he was the president of the International Academy of Sciences RSM-Mexico, (the first branch of the IAS-RSM outside the European Union), as well as the founder and director of the Center of Psychiatry and Holokinetic Psychology (CPH), with branches in Mexico, Argentina and Spain. Since its foundation in May 2012, he was also the president of the International Academy of Holokinetic Psychology (AIPH). He acted as Supervisor and Professor in the Internet Course in Holokinetic Psychology from 2007 until the end of his life.

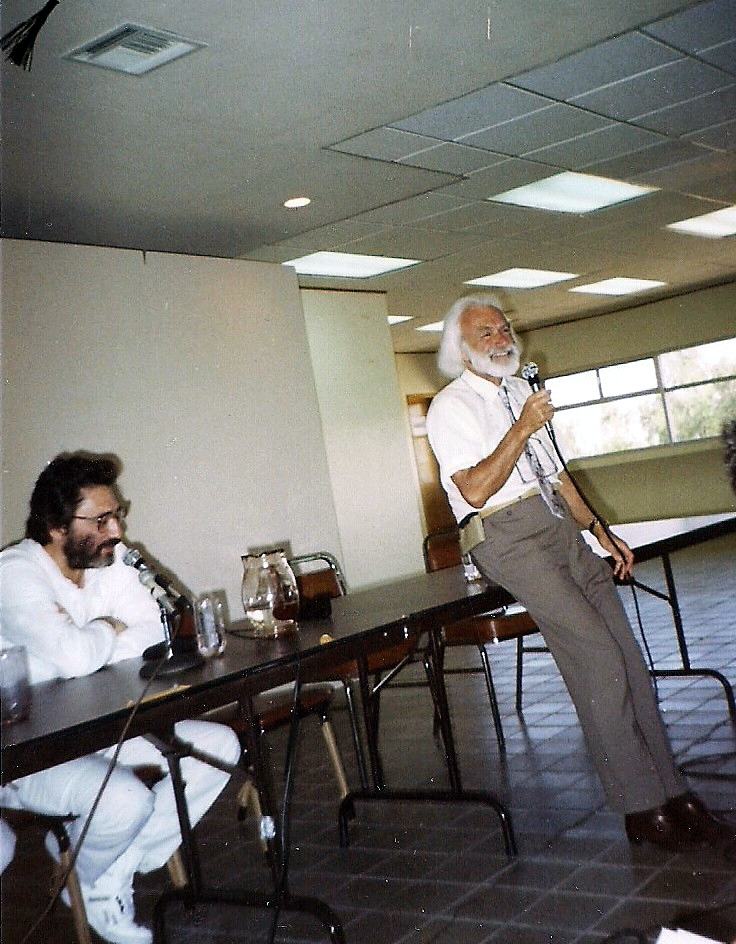
Dr. Karl Pribram with Dr. Ruben Feldman González in UABC Mexicali, 1989

He has shared dialogues, forums, and congresses with investigators and figures in the scientific field, among them the above mentioned Karl Pribram in Stanford University (whom he invited to the University of Baja California [UABC] where he was a professor), and David Bohm in England, who was a fellow of Albert Einstein and candidate for the Nobel Prize in Physics; with Bhurrus Skinner in Miami, Florida; Margaret Mahler and Phyllis Greenacre in Philadelphia; with the educator Jiddu Krishnamurti in California, and with a wide range of university professors and investigators around the world. His encounters and friendship with the latter lasted from 1975 until Krishnamurti's death in 1986. He wrote the book “My Dialogues with Jiddu Krishnamurti” based on these meetings. This book has been cited as a source on Krishnamurti.

== Psycho-history ==
Feldman-González has written and published digitally a series of psycho-historic novels. In these novels, he tried to bring to light unknown aspects and historical events from different periods.

== Esperanto ==
Rubén Feldman-González was fluent in Esperanto, and he has emphasized its role as a promoter of understanding and peace. Previous to beginning his university studies in Medicine, he was active in teaching Esperanto. He founded the Esperanto Association in Santa Fe, Argentina, and the Argentine Esperanto Youth Organization (Argentejo), being the first president. In 1966, he founded what became the Pasporta Servo of the World Esperanto Youth Organization, a free international hosting network for Esperanto speakers.

== Published work ==
- Spanish: El Nuevo Paradigma en Psicología. English: The New Paradigm in Psychology. ISBN 970-9775-02-2.
- Spanish: Psicología Holokinética (El único paradigma científico en psicología).
- English: Holokinetic Psychology (The only scientific paradigm in psychology).
- Spanish: La Percepción Unitaria. English: Unitary Perception. ISBN 970-9775-00-6.
- Spanish: La Psicología del Siglo XXI. English: The Psychology of the 21st Century. ISBN 970-9775-01-4.
- Spanish: Psicología Cristiana. English: Christian Psychology. ISBN 970-9775-03-0.
- Spanish: Latindioamérica. English: Latindioamerica.
- Spanish: Lo profundo de la mente. ISBN 970-9775-04-9.
- English: The Great Leap of Mind: Unitary Perception (Vital Dialogues). ISBN 970-9775-07-3.
- Spanish: Mis encuentros con David Bohm. English: My Meetings with David Bohm. ISBN 968-6957-70-7
- Spanish: La mente y la realidad indivisa. English: Mind and Undivided Reality.
- Spanish: La completa encarnación. English: Complete incarnation. ISBN 978-607-9319-00-7.
- Spanish: El libro de Éfeso. English: The book of Ephesus.
- Spanish: Manual del hombre nuevo. English: Manual of the new man.
- Spanish: Sermón del Desierto. English: Sermon of the desert.
- Spanish: De la prehistoria a la atemporalidad. English: From prehistory to a-temporality.
- Spanish: Mis diálogos con Jiddu Krishnamurti. English: My dialogues with Jiddu Krishnamurti (Donated to KFI [Krishnamurti Foundation India]). ISBN 968-6957-69-3.
- Spanish: La salida de la hipnosis mutua y colectiva. English: The way out of mutual and collective hypnosis.
- Spanish: La mente también es Percepcion Unitaria. English: Mind is also Unitary Perception. ISBN 970-9775-06-5.
- Spanish: Degeneración, Reproducción y Resurrección. English: Degeneration, Reproduction and Resurrection. ISBN 970-9775-05-7.
- Spanish: Relación, religión y aislamiento. English: Relationship, religion and isolation.

== Psycho-historic work ==
- Spanish: El niño y el viejo. English: The child and the old man.
- Spanish: Aristandro, el mejor de los varones. English: Aristandro, the best man.
- Spanish: La araña en los juguetes. English: The spider in the toys.
- Spanish: Projecto Ícaro Uno. English: Project Icarus One.
- Spanish: Charity Collins, esclava. English: Charity Collins, slave.
- Spanish: El ensayo de Hamlet. English: Hamlet rehearsal.
- Spanish: Triple infanticidio. English: Triple infanticide.
- Spanish: La adolescente enterrada. English: The buried girl.
