= Friendship Force International =

Nonprofit organization

- Founded: March 1, 1977; 48 years ago
- Founder: Wayne Smith; Jimmy Carter
- Products: Homestay
- Services: Hospitality
- Key people: Jeremi Snook, president & CEO
- Website: thefriendshipforce.org

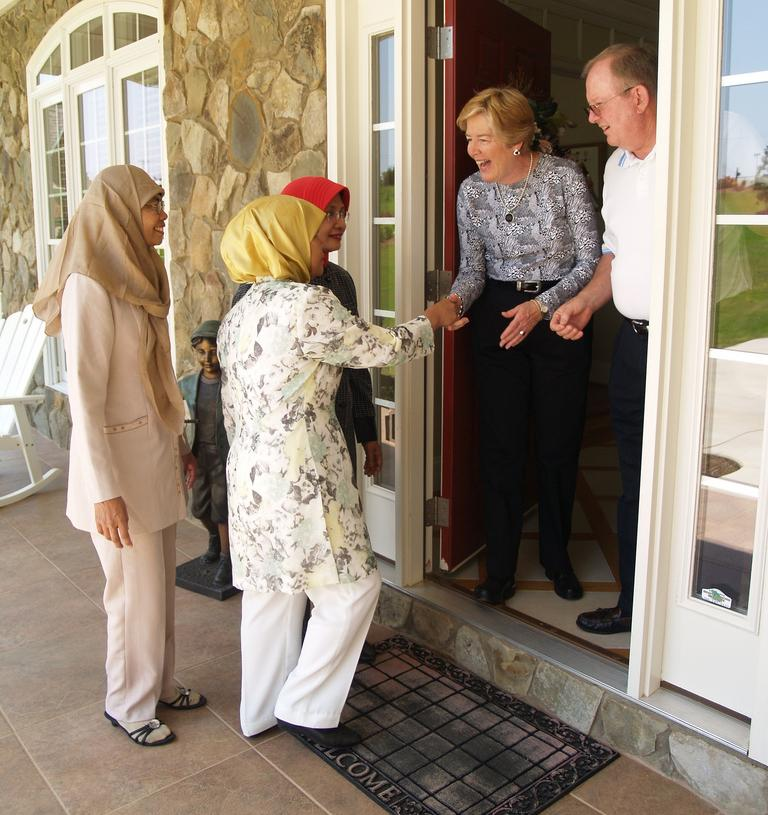
Indonesian guests meet their hosts in Hartwell, Georgia

Friendship Force International (FFI) is a nonprofit organization with the mission of improving intercultural relations, cultural diplomacy, friendship, and intercultural competence via homestays. The organization operates in more than 60 countries and in 6 continents, with 15,000 active members and over 300 annual programs, called "Journeys".

The organization holds continuing fundraising campaigns and has a goal of increasing membership from 15,000 to 25,000 people.

== History ==
The program got its foundation in a project established by Presbyterian minister Wayne Smith and then-governor of Georgia Jimmy Carter in 1973, after organizing an exchange program with Pernambuco, Brazil in which the Brazilians stayed in the Georgia Governor's Mansion.

FFI was unveiled on March 1, 1977, by President Jimmy Carter and Smith at a White House gathering of state governors. First Lady Rosalynn Carter served as Honorary Chairperson until 2002.

On July 4, 1977, the first exchange took place; it involved 762 members that traveled between Atlanta and Newcastle upon Tyne. For the first five years, FFI used air charters to shuttle delegations of 150 to 400 visitors between partner cities.

In 1982, the format was changed from large simultaneous homestays to smaller non-simultaneous visits using commercial airlines.

In the 1980s, Ryōichi Sasakawa donated money to the organization that allowed the program to grow internationally.

In 1985, FFI instituted the American Russian Mutual Survival program to encourage "the use of arms that embrace rather than arms that destroy" and facilitated exchanges between the United States and the Soviet Union.

In 1992, FFI was nominated for the Nobel Peace Prize for its work building understanding between the people of the United States and the Soviet Union during the Cold War.

In June 2012, on its 35th anniversary, FFI launched a program to Cuba.

In July 2013, Joy DiBenedetto was named president and chief executive officer of FFI.

Effective November 9, 2015, Jeremi Snook became the 6th president and chief executive officer of the organization.

In November 2017, FFI announced a partnership with Global Green USA to promote environmental sustainability, peace, understanding, and friendship.
