= CouchSurfing =

Homestay platform

Couchsurfing International Inc.
- Company type: C corporation
- Available in: English, French, German, Italian, Polish, Portuguese, Russian, Simplified Chinese and Spanish
- Founded: 2 April 2003 (New Hampshire nonprofit organization); 3 May 2011 (Delaware for-profit corporation)
- Area served: Global
- Founder: Casey Fenton; Daniel Hoffer; Sebastian Le Tuan; Leonardo Bassani da Silveira
- Key people: Patrick Dugan (CEO)
- Products: Homestay
- Services: Social networking service
- Website: www.couchsurfing.com
- Users: 12,000,000 users
- Launched: 12 June 2004; 22 years ago

CouchSurfing is a hospitality exchange service by which users can request free short-term homestays or interact with other people who are interested in travel. It is accessible via a website and mobile app. It uses a subscription business model, and while hosts are not allowed to charge for lodging, members must pay a fee to access the platform.

== History ==
=== Conception (1999–2004) ===
Couchsurfing was conceived by computer programmer and New Hampshire native Casey Fenton in 1999, when he was 21 years old. The idea arose after Fenton found a cheap flight from Boston to Iceland but did not have lodging. Fenton hacked into a database of the University of Iceland and randomly e-mailed 1,500 students asking for a homestay. He received between 50 and 100 offers and chose to stay at the home of an Icelandic rhythm and blues singer. On the return flight to Boston, he came up with the idea to create the website. He registered the couchsurfing.com domain name on 12 June 1999. Fenton was also inspired by a trip he took 2 years earlier to Egypt, where he was shown around by a local.

Couchsurfing International Inc. was formed on 2 April 2003 as a New Hampshire nonprofit corporation, with plans to apply for 501(c)(3) tax exemption.

The website was launched on 12 June 2004 with the cooperation of Dan Hoffer, Sebastien Le Tuan, and Leonardo Silveira.

=== Development of the website by volunteers (2006–2011) ===
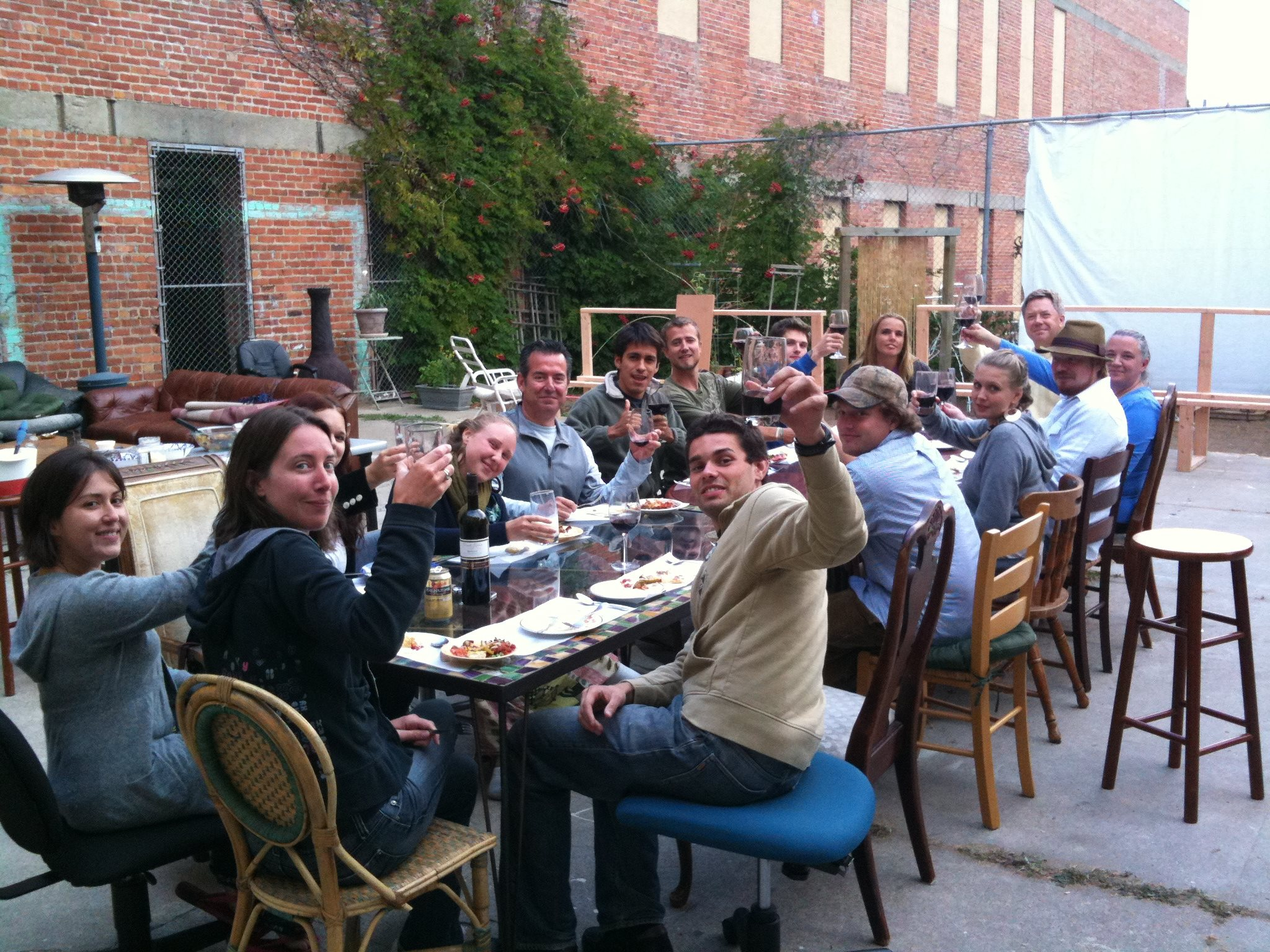
Lunch at former headquarters in San Francisco

From 2006 until the company raised financing in 2011, development of the website occurred mostly at events called "Couchsurfing Collectives", in which members met to voluntarily improve the website. Collectives took place in Montreal, Vienna, New Zealand, Rotterdam, Costa Rica, Samara, Alaska, Istanbul, and Thailand. However, the collectively-coded website was full of software bugs and crashes were common. Many members believed that the website needed to be redesigned from scratch. The collectives were also hindered by volunteers, who just came to party, as well as by tax laws in each jurisdiction.

In June 2006, problems with the website database resulted in much of it being irrevocably lost. Founder Casey Fenton posted online asking for help. A Couchsurfing Collective was underway in Montreal at the time and those in attendance raised $8,000 in donations and committed to recreate the website. In 2007, Google search volume for couchsurfing.org overtook the search volume for Hospitality Club.

=== Change to a for-profit corporation and financing (2011) ===
The company applied for 501(c)(3) tax status as a nonprofit organization in November 2007 but tax exempt status was rejected by the Internal Revenue Service in early 2011. The assets then needed to be acquired from the New Hampshire non-profit, which including legal fees, was to cost $1 million. In August 2011, a private for-profit Delaware C corporation, also called Couchsurfing International, Inc., which was formed on 3 May 2011, raised $7.6 million in a first-round financing led by Benchmark Capital and Omidyar Network and acquired the assets of the New Hampshire company. The New Hampshire non-profit company was dissolved on 4 November 2011.

The conversion to a for-profit corporation was objected to by many members since the guiding principles of the original non profit organisation promised that CouchSurfing operates as a nonprofit, a promise that was broken by Fenton and Hoffer. Founder Casey Fenton said he received 1,500 emails in the days after announcing the conversion.

The company was briefly certified as a B corporation (mistakenly labeled as a Benefit corporation in a blog post by Casey Fenton), but that certification was eventually removed.

In August 2012, Couchsurfing received an additional $15 million in funding from an investor group led by General Catalyst, with participation by Menlo Ventures, as well as existing investors Benchmark Capital and Omidyar Network. Point Nine Capital became the first European investor in CouchSurfing. The additional funding brought the company's total funding raised to $22.6 million. That year, the company launched mobile apps for iOS and Android.

=== Management turnover (2012–2015) ===
Tony Espinoza, previously vice president and general manager of social-network games at MTV, was CEO from April 2012 to October 2013. Under his leadership, driven by an aggressive advertising campaign, membership doubled; however, new users were less interested in hosting other travelers and in the "pay it forward" spirit of other members. Tensions between Fenton and Espinoza led to Fenton being fired from the company he founded, although at that time, he kept his seat on the board of directors. The company rented office space in San Francisco. By the end of Espinoza's tenure, the company had depleted half of its financing and laid off 40% of its staff.

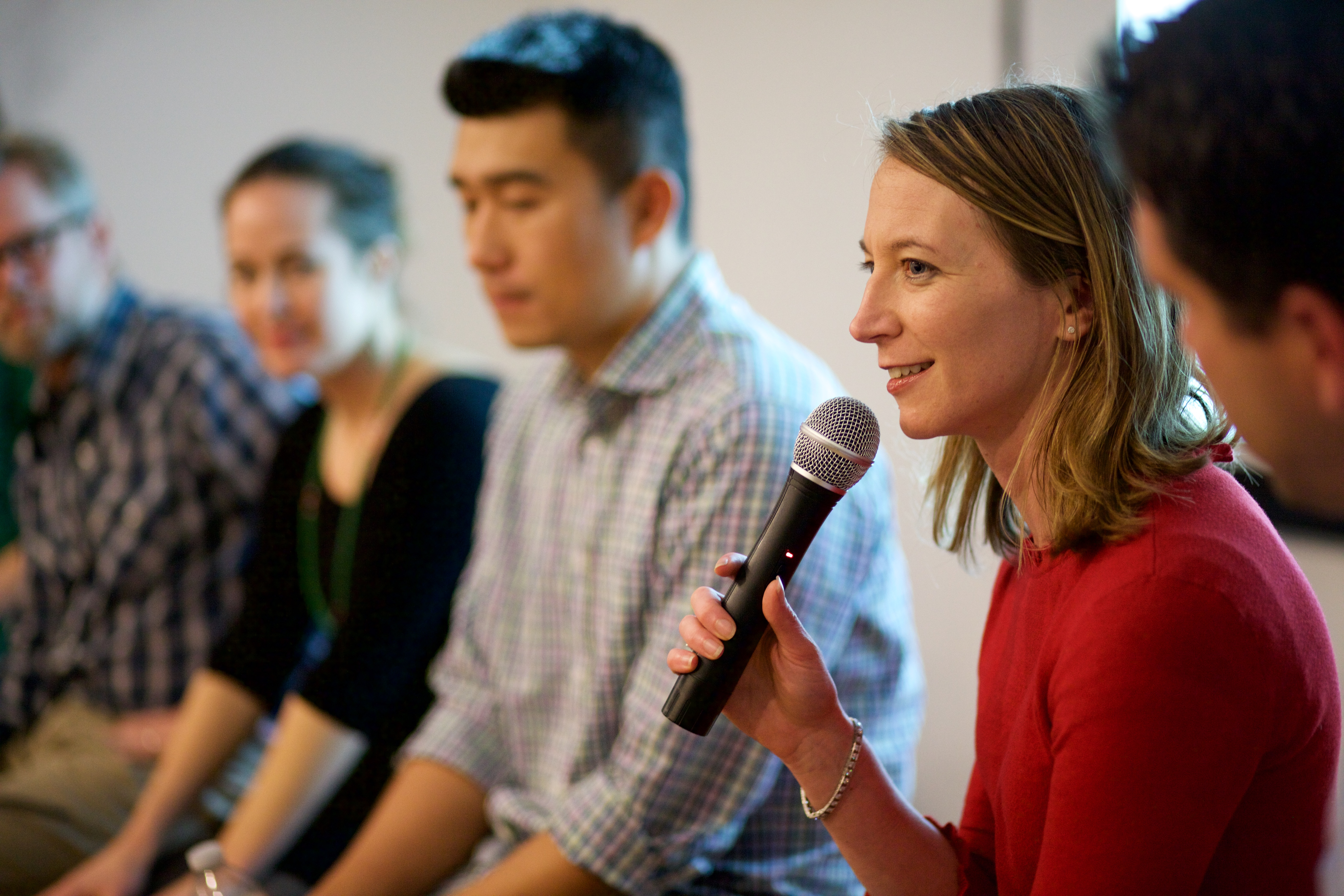
Jennifer Billock, CEO of CouchSurfing from October 2013 to October 2015

Jennifer Billock, who had been head of product marketing, then took over as CEO.

=== New investment (2015) ===
In 2015, Couchsurfing required additional funding but did not have the metrics to raise a Series C round. Instead, the company received funding from an affiliate of Patrick Dugan (born 1980). Dugan's investment was large enough to reconstitute the board of directors. Casey Fenton was removed from the board of directors due to differences with management and has since no longer been involved in the day-to-day operations of the company. Fenton later founded Upstock.

In June 2016, the company added a feature to its mobile app called "hangouts" that enables members to quickly meet with other nearby members.

=== Change to subscription business model (2020) ===
In May 2020, during the COVID-19 pandemic, the company switched to a subscription business model.

== See also ==
- Altruism
- Gift economy
- Hospitality
- List of hospitality exchange services
- Reputation system
