= GuestReady =

Swiss property management company

GuestReady Group
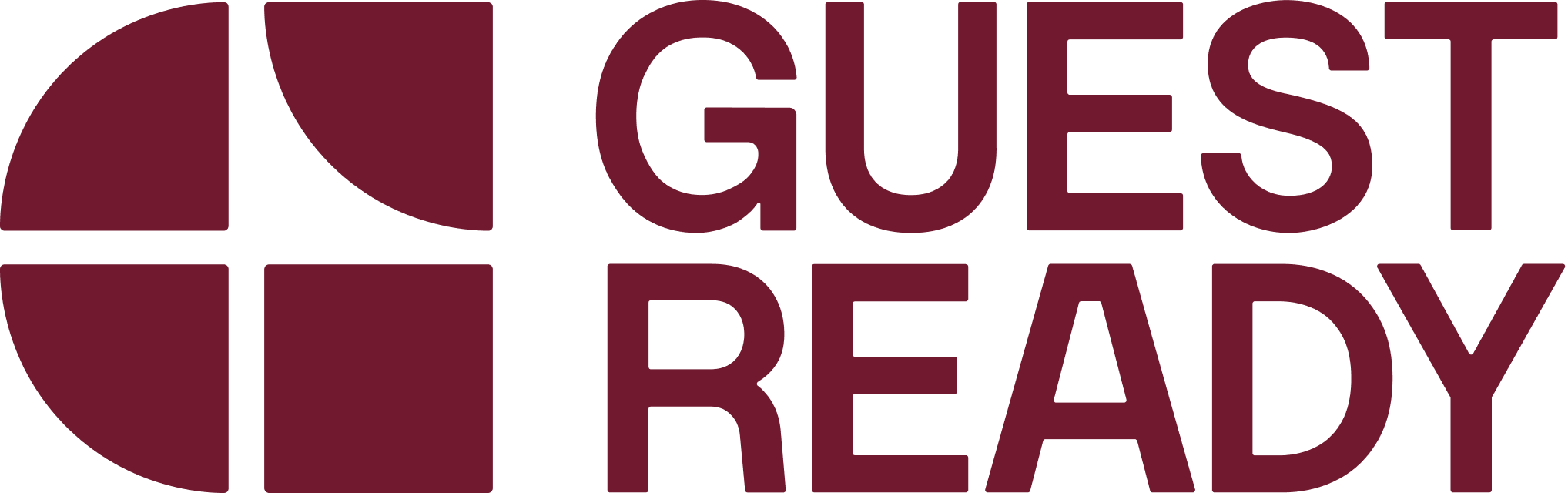
- Company type: Privately held company
- Industry: Property management Travel agency
- Founded: 2016; 10 years ago
- Headquarters: Trogen, Switzerland
- Area served: United Kingdom, France, United Arab Emirates, Portugal, Malaysia, Saudi Arabia
- Key people: Christian Mischler (Chairman); Alexander Limpert (CEO); Patrick Degen (CFO); François Lavie (CTO)
- Brands: GuestReady, BnbLord, Oporto City Flats, We Stay In Paris, RentalReady, The Porto Concierge
- Website: www.guestready.com

GuestReady is a property management company and online travel agency headquartered in Trogen, Switzerland. Founded in 2016, it is active in Europe, the Middle East and Southeast Asia. It helps hosts manage their properties on online rental marketplaces such as Airbnb.

The GuestReady Group offers short-term rental management via the brands GuestReady, Oporto City Flats, and We Stay In Paris. GuestReady focuses on Airbnb management, which includes services such as customer relationship management (CRM), revenue management, marketing channel management, guest check-in, facility and laundry services. The group also offers Business-to-business services and distributes the information technology system as RentalReady to other property managers that intend to offer short-term rental management to their clients.

The group is active in Europe, Middle East and Asia. It offers property management as GuestReady in the United Kingdom (London, Manchester, Edinburgh), France (Paris, Cannes, Lyon, Bordeaux), Portugal (Lisbon, Porto), United Arab Emirates (Dubai), Malaysia (Kuala Lumpur), Hong Kong and Riyadh (Saudi Arabia). GuestReady offered Airbnb-management in Singapore between 2016 and 2018 but decided to pull out of the market due to changes in regulation of short-lets in Singapore.

== History ==
GuestReady was founded in April 2016 by Alexander Limpert (CEO), Christian Mischler (Executive Chairman) and Patrick Degen (CFO).

In summer 2017, European competitor Easy Rental Services was acquired and GuestReady announced a seed round of US$3 million, led by the Russian fund Impulse VC. In December 2018, GuestReady acquired Portugal-based Oporto City Flats. At the same time, GuestReady took over the management of the property portfolio of We Stay In Paris, a local competitor in France.

In April 2019, GuestReady acquired BnbLord, the largest short-term rental management company in France and Portugal by delivering short-term rental management on a portfolio of 1,000 properties. The founders of BnbLord, Léo Bonnet, Jacques Lavie, and François Lavie, joined the GuestReady Group in senior management positions.

In parallel to the BnbLord acquisition, GuestReady created an umbrella brand called GuestReady Group. It reported a portfolio of more than 4,000 properties.

== RentalReady ==
RentalReady is a property management software developed by the GuestReady Group, designed for vacation rental operators and managers of short-term rental portfolios. The platform combines operational management features, channel synchronization, pricing tool integrations, process automation, and centralized guest communication. Initially built to support GuestReady's internal operations, the software began being licensed to external companies in 2019, expanding its role within the industry.

The system includes artificial intelligence capabilities such as automated itinerary generation, sentiment analysis in guest communication, and intelligent review responses, along with an autonomous AI agent capable of managing multilingual guest interactions. With mobile applications for iOS and Android and integrations with platforms including Airbnb, Booking.com, and VRBO, RentalReady positions itself as a comprehensive solution for property management professionals in the short-term rental sector.
