= Kindred (company) =

Members-only home exchange network

- Type: Private
- Industry: Home exchange
- Founded: 2021
- Founders: Justine Palefsky, Tasneem Amina
- Headquarters: San Francisco, California, United States
- Website: livekindred.com

Kindred is a members-only network that facilitates home exchanges.

Founded in 2021, Kindred facilitates both direct one-to-one home swaps and traveling with credits earned by hosting. In 2025, Kindred stated that it had over 300,000 homes in over 150 cities in North America and Europe. The company is headquartered in San Francisco.

== History ==
The company was founded in 2021 by Justine Palefsky and Tasneem Amina, who met while working at Opendoor, a real-estate technology company. Justine and Tasneem first came up with the idea based on their experiences growing up in families that welcomed visitors to stay with them. While working at Opendoor, they realized travel had become expensive and that their best travel experiences came from hosting friends and family, leading to the idea for Kindred.

The company started a private beta in the spring of 2022. By 2025, Kindred reported having over 300,000 homes in over 150 cities in North America and Europe.

== See also ==
- Collaborative consumption
- Vacation rental
- Airbnb
