= WWOOF =

Group of national organizations supporting organic farming

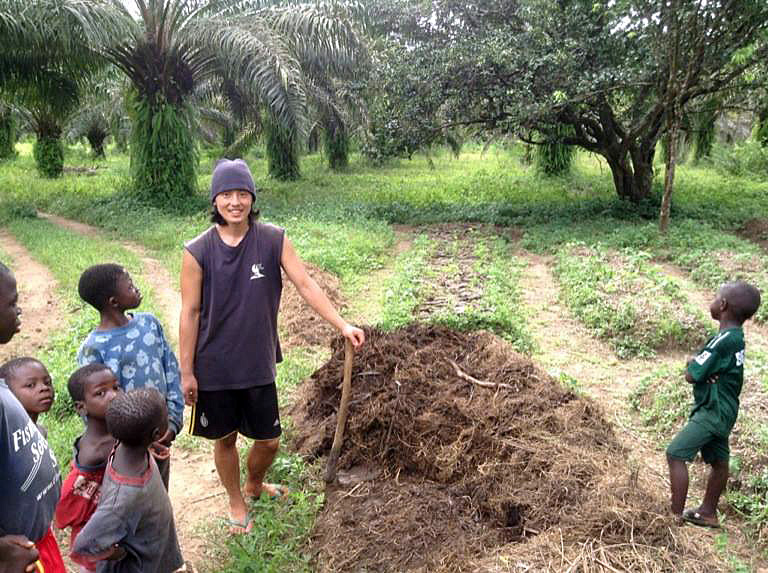
Japanese "wwoofer" in Guinea (2014)

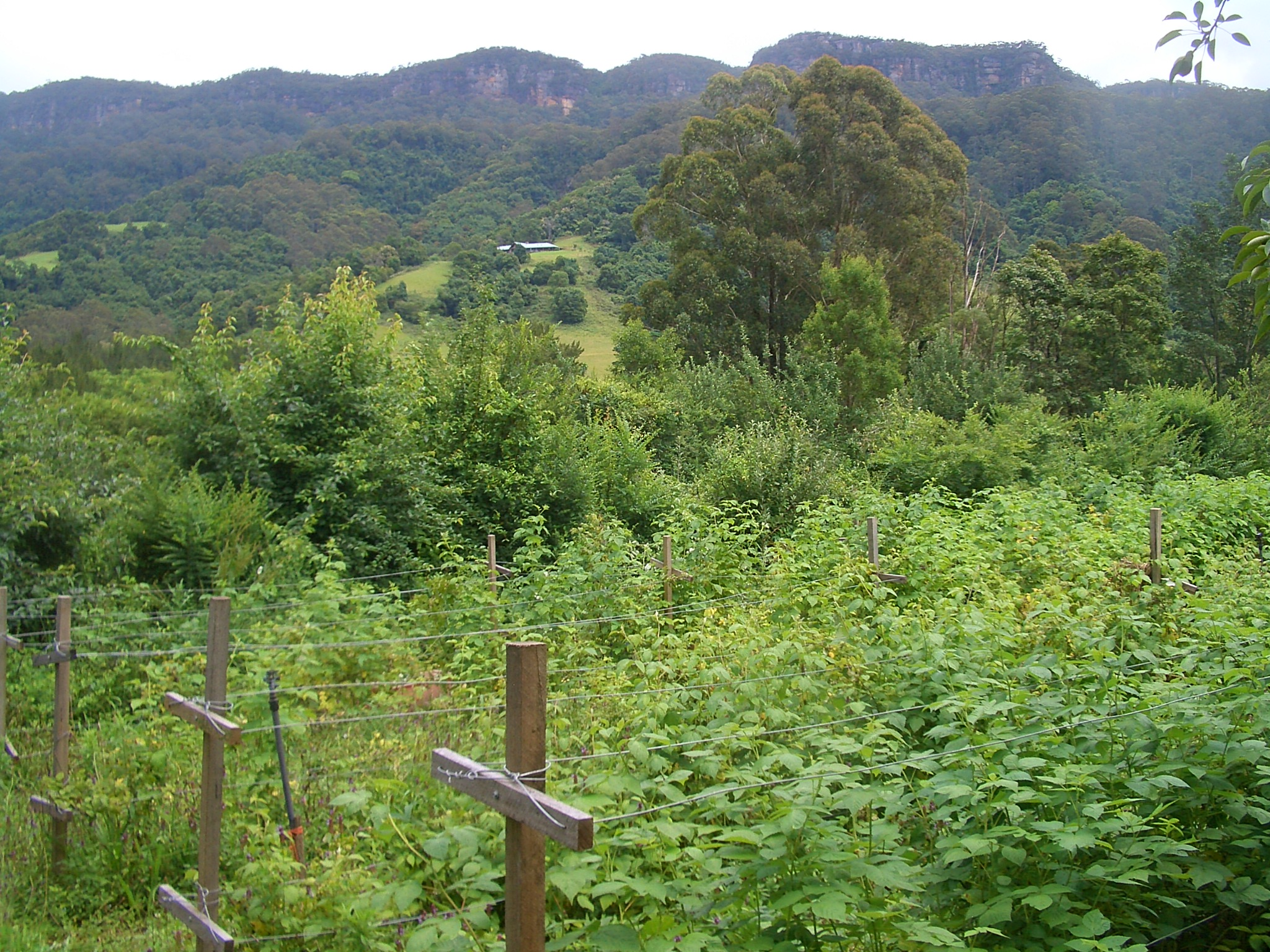
A WWOOF participant farm in Australia. The raspberry bushes pictured require regular weeding.

World Wide Opportunities on Organic Farms (WWOOF /wʊf/), or World Wide Organization of Organic Farms, is a network of national organizations that facilitate homestays on organic farms. There is no central list or organization that encompasses all WWOOF hosts. As there is no single international WWOOF membership, all recognized WWOOF country organizations strive to maintain similar standards, and cooperate together to promote the aims of WWOOF.

WWOOF provides volunteers (often called "WWOOFers" or "woofers" /ˈwʊfərz/) with enough experience in organic and ecologically sound growing methods to help the organic movement. They let volunteers experience life in a rural setting or in a different nation. WWOOF volunteers generally do not receive a salary in exchange for services. The host provides food, lodging, and opportunities to learn, in exchange for assistance with farming or gardening activities for the host.

The duration of the visit can range from days to years. Workdays average five to six hours, and participants interact with WWOOFers from other countries. WWOOF farms include private gardens through smallholdings, allotments, and commercial farms. Farms become WWOOF hosts by enlisting with their regional organization. In countries with no WWOOF organization, farms enlist with WWOOF Independents.

== History ==
WWOOF originally stood for "Working Weekends On Organic Farms" and began in England in 1971. Sue Coppard, a woman working as a secretary in London, wanted to provide urban dwellers with access to the countryside while supporting the organic movement. Her idea started with a trial of working weekends for four people at the biodynamic farm at Emerson College in Sussex. People soon started volunteering for longer periods than just weekends, so the name was changed to Willing Workers On Organic Farms. Eventually, the word "work" caused problems with some countries' labor laws and immigration authorities, who tended to treat WWOOFers as migrant workers and oppose foreigners competing for local jobs. (Many WWOOFers enter countries on tourist visas, which is illegal in countries such as the United States.) Both in an attempt to circumvent this and also in recognition of WWOOFing's worldwide scope, the name was changed again in 2000 to World Wide Opportunities on Organic Farms. Some WWOOF groups (such as Australia) choose to retain the older name, however.

== Volunteering ==
Volunteers choose which country they would like to visit and volunteer in and it is their responsibility to contact the relevant organization to arrange the dates and duration of their stay at selected farms. The duration of a volunteer's stay can range from days to months, but is typically one to two weeks. Volunteers usually work for 4–6 hours a day in return for a one day's worth of food on top of accommodation. Volunteers are expected to assist with a variety of tasks, including but not limited to; sowing seed, making compost, gardening, planting, cutting wood, weeding, harvesting, packing, milking, feeding, fencing, making mud-bricks, wine making, cheese making, and bread baking.

== See also ==
- Agritourism
- Agroecology
- Ecotourism
- Forest farming
- Natural farming
- Permaculture
- Workaway
