= Allgemeiner Deutscher Fahrrad-Club =

Association for cyclists

Allgemeiner Deutscher Fahrrad-Club (ADFC)
- Founded: 27 September 1979
- Type: Non-governmental organization
- Purpose: Environmentalism, soft mobility, cycling
- Location: Bremen, Germany
- Region served: Germany
- Members: 200,000 (10/2020)
- Key people: Frank Masurat, Federal Chairman
- Website: www.adfc.de

The Allgemeiner Deutscher Fahrrad-Club (ADFC) (German Cyclist's Association) is a registered cycling association and club for cyclists in Germany.

== History ==
The founding meeting of the ADFC took place on 27 September 1979 in Bremen, after the idea to establish such an organisation arose during the International Bicycle and Motorbike Exhibition (IFMA) on 18 April 1978. Jan Tebbe from Bremen provided the idea and was the first chairman of the ADFC. Other founders were planning and mobility scientists like Heiner Monheim or Tilman Bracher.

The ADFC is an interest group of cyclists in German towns, particularly in mobility policy. It became known for the bicycle climate test, which was carried out in 1988, 1991, 2003, 2005 and 2012.

The ADFC is a member of the European Cyclists' Federation and the International Mountain Bicycling Association. At the demand of the ADFC a National Cycle Traffic Plan was presented in 2002 for the first time by the Cabinet of Germany.

== Activities ==
=== Theft prevention ===
In some regions, the ADFC offers bicycle coding, coordinated with the police (FEIN coding). The ADFC advises in matters of theft prevention, secure bicycle parking facilities, and locks.

=== Cycle tours ===
The local and district associations of the ADFC offer members and non-members throughout Germany cycle tours of varying difficulty and duration. The programmes are available from the groups and increasingly on the Internet.

=== Action ===
"Mit dem Rad zur Arbeit" ("Cycling to Work"): Nationally exclusive with public health insurance, the campaign motivates employees to travel to work by bike, and to encourage companies to create favourable conditions to this end, e.g. showers or parking facilities. Aims are preventive health care and the reduction of motorised individual transport.

=== Hospitality exchange ===
The Dachgeber ("roof giver") is a sub-organization of the ADFC and a hospitality exchange service, which mediates on a basis of mutual free accommodation for cyclists on tour. Dachgeber is issued by the traffic educator, bicycle technician and bicycle travel expert of ADFC, Wolfgang Reiche. The hosts are members of ADFC and provide accommodation free of charge on a reciprocal basis, which by rule only includes a place to sleep for the air mattress to be brought along. Dachgeber was created in 1987 as a result of a global bicycle journey that lasted four years. Dachgeber is a non-profit project and lists 3.200 hosts.

=== Travel ===
The subdivisions of the ADFC also function as tour operators. State, district and local associations offer guided cycle tours of several days, in addition the ADFC brokers cycling holidays. In 1995 the quality certification "Bed & Bike." was started. Bed & Bike undertakings are guest establishments from five star hotel to youth hostel and camping site, which commit themselves to cater for the expectations of cycle tourists. Since 2006, ADFC tests and certifies long-distance cycle paths as ADFC Quality Routes ("ADFC-Qualitätsradroute") according to criteria developed by the tourism expert committee. In August 2008 the top mark of five stars was assigned for the first time to a long-distance cycle route: the Main Valley Cycle Route near Randersacker.

=== Consulting ===
In rented information centres the ADFC offers advice on topics concerning bicycle and traffic, gives tips on cycle holidays, helps with the planning of tours, and lends books, magazines, bikes and accessories. With its programme "Bike + Business", ADFC of Hesse advises firms and administrations on the creation of cycle-friendly conditions for their staff.

=== Maps ===
ADFC is involved in the publication of a bicycle map series on a scale of 1:150.000 (according to the publisher's imprint Germany's most purchased cycle tour map) as well as of regional maps on a scale of 1:75.000 (occasionally also 1:100.000 or 1:50.000) and often creates bike maps right up to bicycle town plans following the slogan "from cyclists for cyclists." They offer courses and information on GPS navigation.

=== Literature ===
Members receive the magazine "Radwelt" every two months, and other regional bicycle magazines, as well as their tour programme in paper form.

=== Insurance ===
Membership in ADFC gives insurance with excess for legal protection and liability as non-motorised road users; insurances against bicycle theft are available.

=== Miscellaneous ===
A few ADFC subdivisions organize bike travel fairs, bicycle flea markets, repair courses, courses on tour planning, cycle riding courses (cycle riding schools) for adults or maintain self-help workshops. ADFC Berlin organizes the converging bicycle rally, which according to their own assessment is the largest bicycle demonstration in the world.

== Data ==
- Members: over 200,000 (as of October 2020)
- State Associations: 16
- District Associations: around 400
- Committees offices and info centres: around 60

== Managing Committee ==
- Frank Masurat, Federal Chairman
- Deputies:
  - Sarah Holczer, Deputy Federal Chairwoman
  - Cathrin Cailliau
  - Amelie Döres
  - Joachim Lohse
  - Christoph Schmidt
  - Christian Tänzler

== Committees ==
- Federal structure: The ADFC is structured federally. In addition to the Federal Association there are state and district associations. The local associations form the lowest level. With Federal Board, Federal General Assembly and Federal Central Committee the association is built up in a similar way to the German government (Analogy: Bundestag and Federal Assembly).
- Delegate principle: Each level elects, besides its own managing committees, delegates who decide the managing committee of the next highest level. So for instance the delegates of a Federal State Assembly elect the participants of the Federal General Assembly. This in turn determines the Federal Board.
- The voluntary working Federal Board is elected by the Federal General Assembly. For the implementation of its decisions the managing committee can draw on the federal office in Bremen.
- The Federal General Assembly. is the highest committee of the association, which holds an annual meeting and elects the Federal Board for two years. The basic decisions on the aims and the focus of the association's work are as a rule made in this committee.
- The Federal Central Committee is composed of representatives from the state associations (as a rule members of the state executive committee) and determines the guidelines for the work of the Federal Board. Thus the central committee is the second highest committee of the ADFC.
- Expert committees advise the Federal Board on the development of ADFC positions. Expert committees are appointed and dissolved by the General Assembly at the suggestion of the central committee. There are exist expert committees on technology, tourism, public transport and cycle traffic. The cycle traffic expert group is a joint commission of the ADFC and the union for urban, regional and state planning.
