= Lodging =

Industry and type of residential accommodation

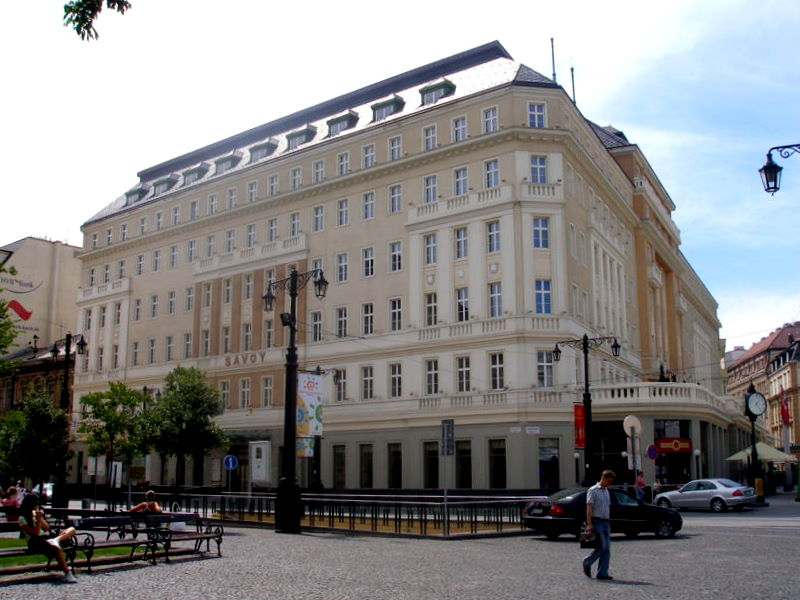
Hotel Carlton in Bratislava, Slovakia.

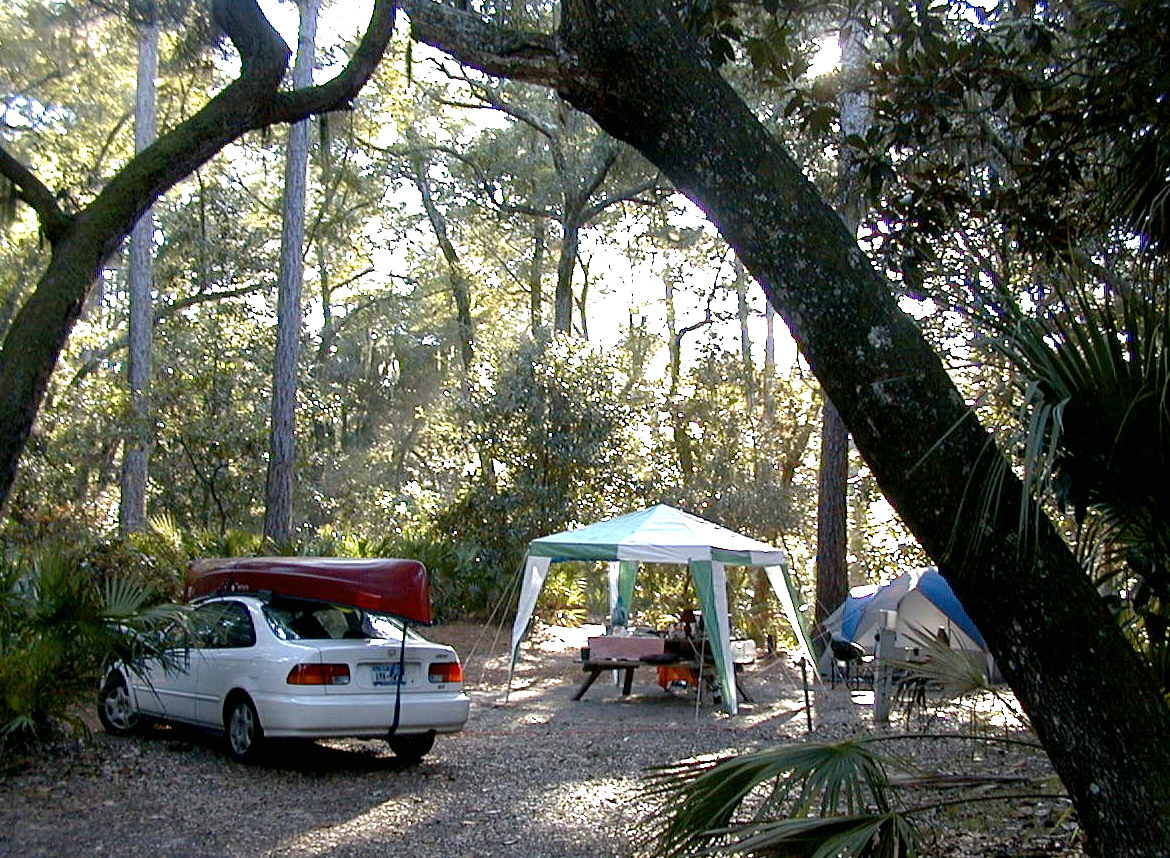
A campsite at Hunting Island State Park in South Carolina

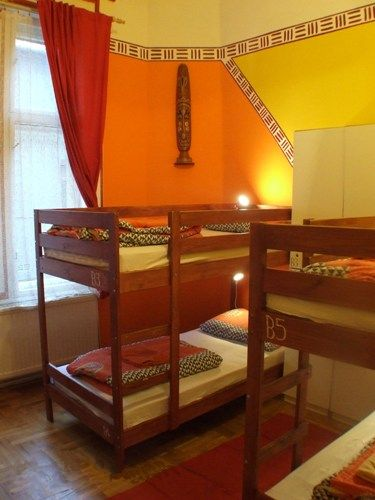
Dorm room from a hostel in Budapest, Hungary

Lodging refers to the use of a short-term dwelling, usually by renting the living space or sometimes through some other arrangement. People who travel and stay away from home for more than a day need lodging for sleep, rest, food, safety, shelter from cold temperatures or rain, storage of luggage and access to common household functions. Lodging can be a form of the sharing economy.

Lodging is done in a hotel, motel, hostel, or inn, a private home (commercial, i.e. a bed and breakfast, a guest house, a vacation rental, or non-commercially, as in certain homestays or the home of friends), in a tent, caravan/campervan (often on a campsite). Lodgings may be self-catering, whereby no food is provided, but cooking facilities are available.

Lodging is offered by an owner of real property or a leasehold estate, including the hotel industry, hospitality industry, real estate investment trusts, and owner-occupancy houses.

Lodging can be facilitated by an intermediary such as an online marketplace.
