= List of Newcastle University people =

This article is a list of people associated with Newcastle University as either a student or teacher.

== A ==
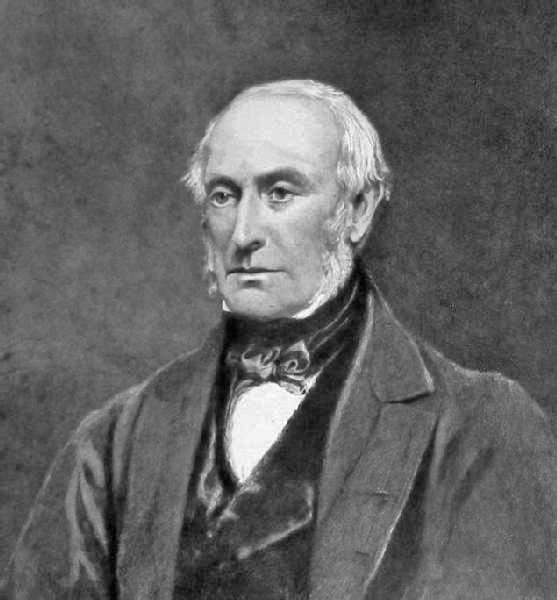
William Armstrong

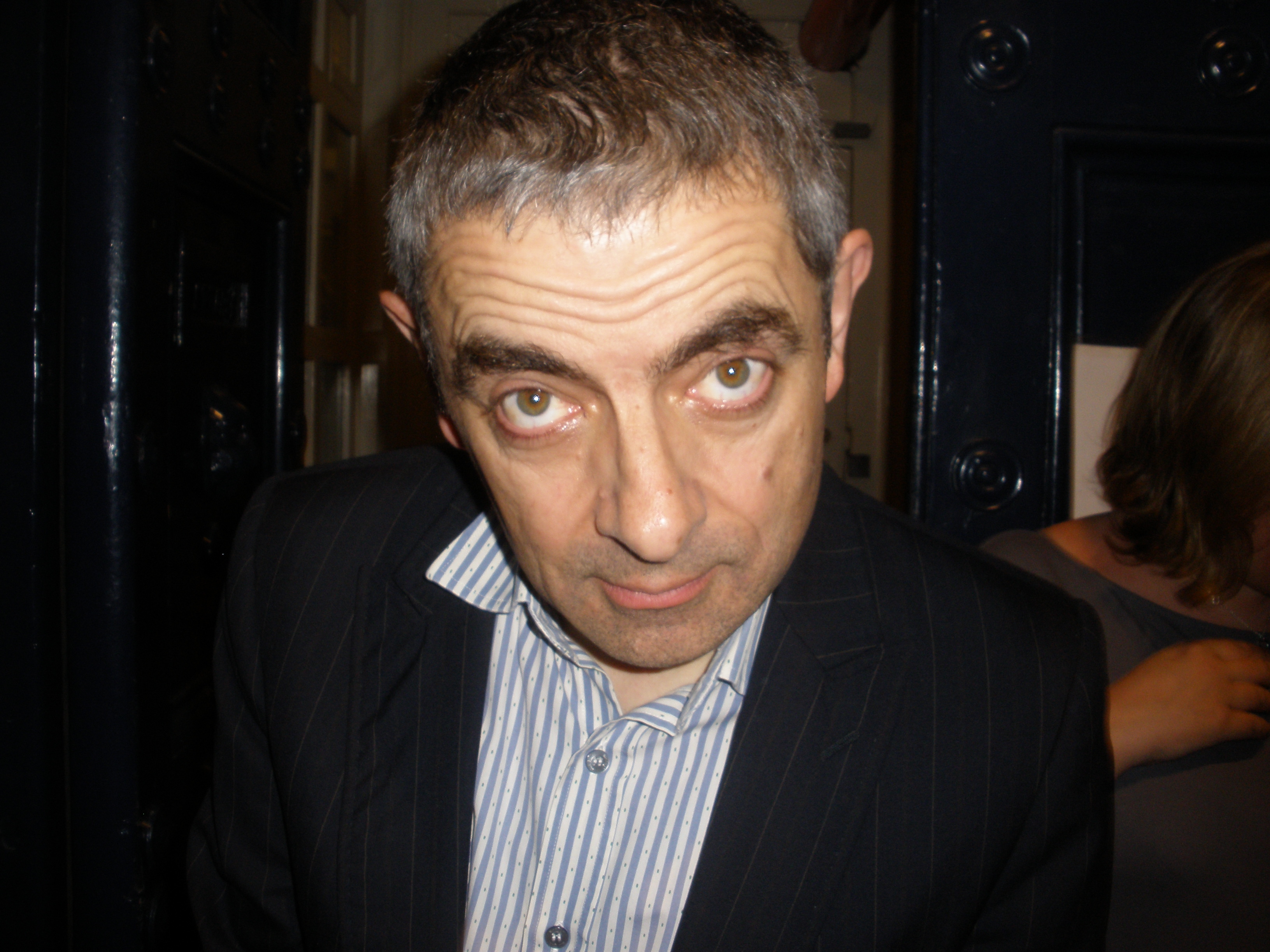
Rowan Atkinson

- Ali Mohamed Shein, 7th President of Zanzibar
- Richard Adams - fairtrade businessman
- Kate Adie - journalist
- Yasmin Ahmad - Malaysian film director, writer and scriptwriter
- Prince Adewale Aladesanmi - Nigerian prince and businessman
- Jane Alexander - Bishop
- Theodosios Alexander (BSc Marine Engineering 1981) - Dean, Parks College of Engineering, Aviation and Technology of Saint Louis University
- William Armstrong, 1st Baron Armstrong - industrialist; in 1871 founded College of Physical Science, an early part of the University
- Roy Ascott - new media artist
- Dennis Assanis - President, University of Delaware
- Neil Astley - publisher, editor and writer
- Rodney Atkinson - eurosceptic conservative academic
- Rowan Atkinson - comedian and actor
- Kane Avellano - Guinness World Record for youngest person to circumnavigate the world by motorcycle (solo and unsupported) at the age of 23 in 2017

== B ==
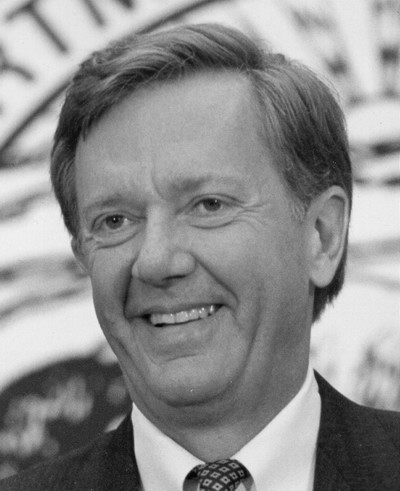
Bruce Babbitt

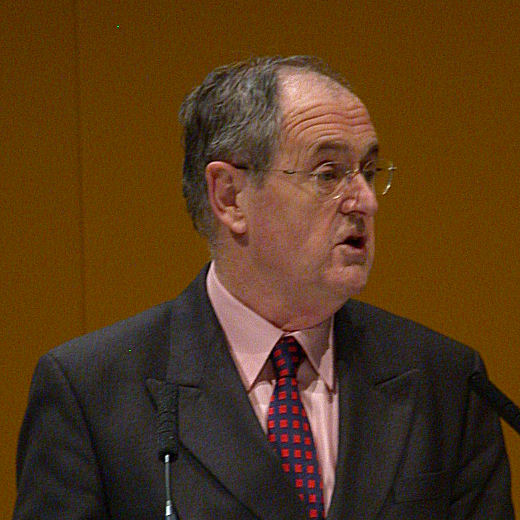
Alan Beith

- Bruce Babbitt - US politician; 16th Governor of Arizona (1978–1987); 47th United States Secretary of the Interior (1993–2001); Democrat
- James Baddiley - biochemist, based at Newcastle University 1954–1983; the Baddiley-Clark building is named in part after him
- Tunde Baiyewu - member of the Lighthouse Family
- Max Balegde - social media star
- John C. A. Barrett - clergyman
- G. W. S. Barrow - historian
- Neil Bartlett - chemist, creation of the first noble gas compounds (BSc and PhD at King's College, University of Durham, later Newcastle University)
- Sue Beardsmore - television presenter
- Peter Phillips Bedson - chemistry professor
- Alan Beith - politician
- Jean Benedetti - biographer, translator, director and dramatist
- Phil Bennion - politician
- Catherine Bertola - contemporary painter
- Simon Best - Captain of the Ulster Rugby team; Prop for the Ireland Team
- Andy Bird - CEO of Disney International
- Rory Jonathan Courtenay Boyle, Viscount Dungarvan - heir apparent to the earldom of Cork
- David Bradley - science writer
- Mike Brearley - professional cricketer, formerly a lecturer in philosophy at the university (1968–1971)
- Constance Briscoe - one of the first black women to sit as a judge in the UK; author of the best-selling autobiography Ugly; found guilty in May 2014 on three charges of attempting to pervert the course of justice; jailed for 16 months
- Steve Brooks - entomologist; attained BSc in Zoology and MSc in Public Health Engineering from Newcastle University in 1976 and 1977 respectively
- Thom Brooks - academic, columnist
- Gavin Brown - academic
- Vicki Bruce - psychologist
- Jo Budd – textile artist
- Basil Bunting - poet; Northern Arts Poetry Fellow at Newcastle University (1968–70); honorary DLitt in 1971
- John Burgan - documentary filmmaker
- Mark Burgess - computer scientist
- Sir John Burn - Professor of Clinical Genetics at Newcastle University Medical School; Medical Director and Head of the Institute of Genetics; Newcastle Medical School alumnus
- John Harrison Burnett - botanist, chair of Botany at King's College, Newcastle (1960–68)

== C ==
- Richard Caddel - poet
- Deborah Cameron - linguist
- Stuart Cameron - lecturer
- John Ashton Cannon - historian; Professor of Modern History; Head of Department of History from 1976 until his appointment as Dean of the Faculty of Arts in 1979; Pro-Vice-Chancellor 1983–1986
- Ian Carr - musician
- Steve Chapman - Principal and Vice-Chancellor of Heriot-Watt University
- Dion Chen - Hong Kong educator, principal of Ying Wa College and former principal of YMCA of Hong Kong Christian College
- Hsing Chia-hui - author
- Ashraf Choudhary - scientist
- Jennifer A. Clack - palaeontologist
- George Clarke - architect
- Brian Clouston - landscape architect
- Ed Coode - Olympic gold medallist
- John Coulson - chemical engineering academic
- Caroline Cox, Baroness Cox - cross-bench member of the British House of Lords
- Nicola Curtin – Professor of Experimental Cancer Therapeutics
- Pippa Crerar - Political Editor of the Daily Mirror

== D ==
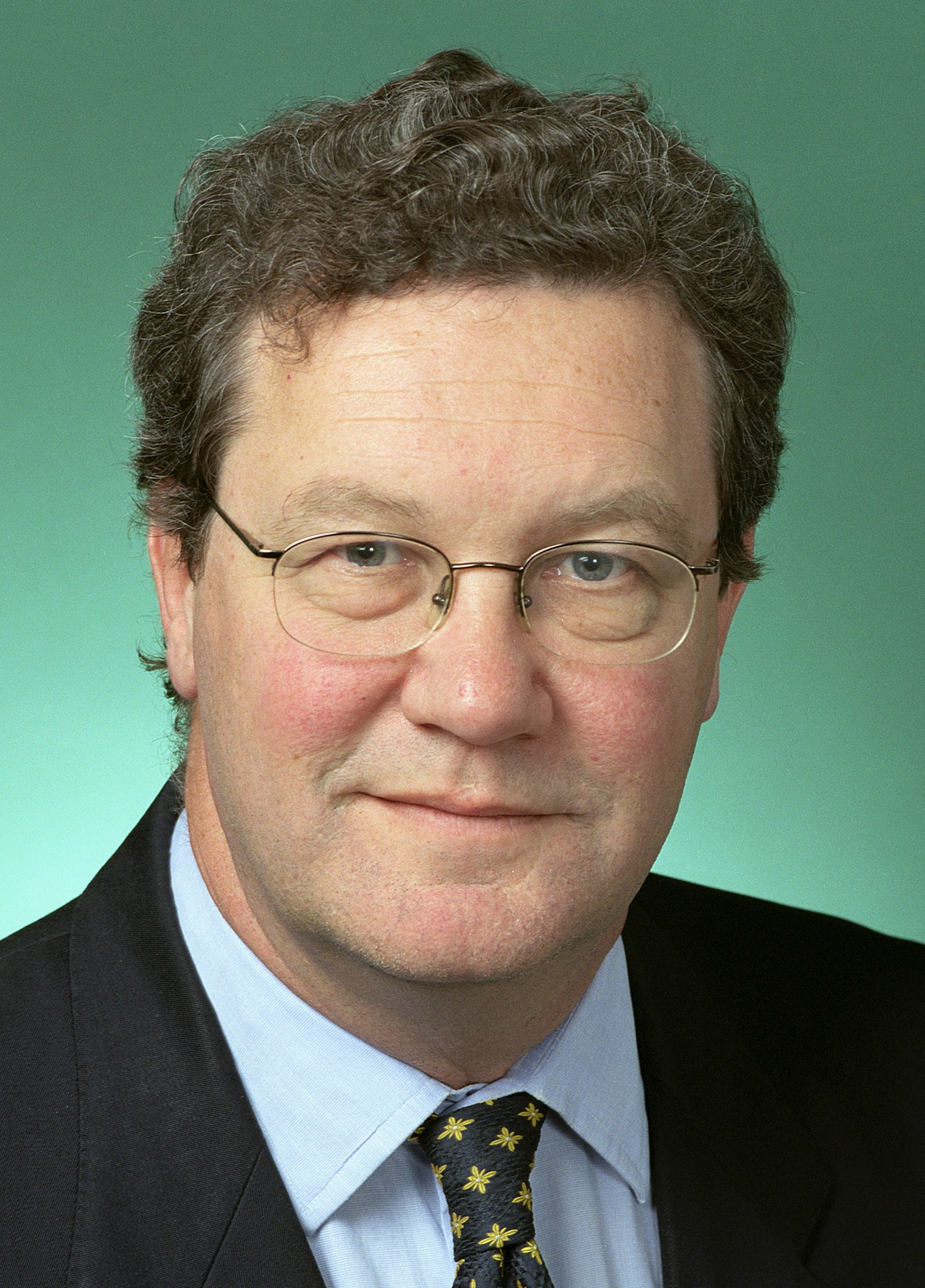
Alexander Downer

- Fred D'Aguiar - author
- Julia Darling - poet, playwright, novelist, MA in Creative Writing
- Chris Day - medical academic and researcher, current (2017-) Vice-Chancellor of the University and Chair of the Russell Group
- Simin Davoudi - academic
- Richard Dawson - researcher in climate and environmental risks to infrastructure and the built environment
- Tom Dening - medical academic and researcher
- Katie Doherty - singer-songwriter
- Annabel Dover - artist, studied fine art 1994–1998
- Alexander Downer - Australian Minister for Foreign Affairs (1996–2007)
- Chloë Duckworth - archaeologist and presenter
- Chris Duffield - Town Clerk and Chief Executive of the City of London Corporation

== E ==
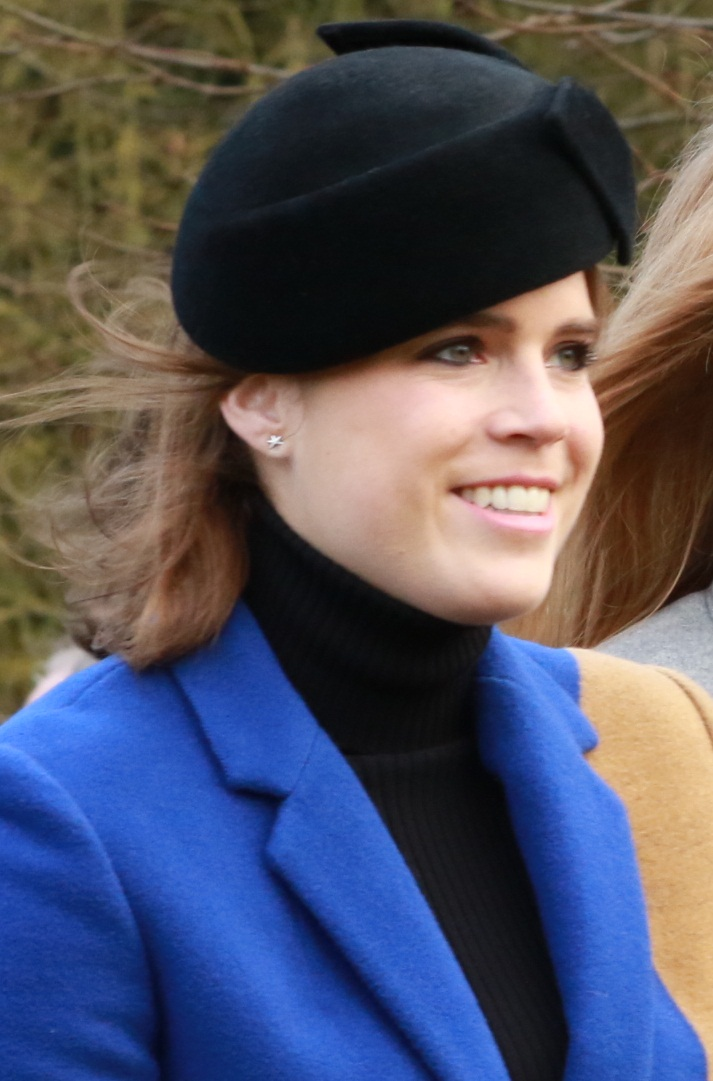
Princess Eugenie, Mrs Jack Brooksbank

- Michael Earl - academic
- Tom English - drummer, Maxïmo Park
- Princess Eugenie - a niece of King Charles III and granddaughter of Queen Elizabeth II.

== F ==
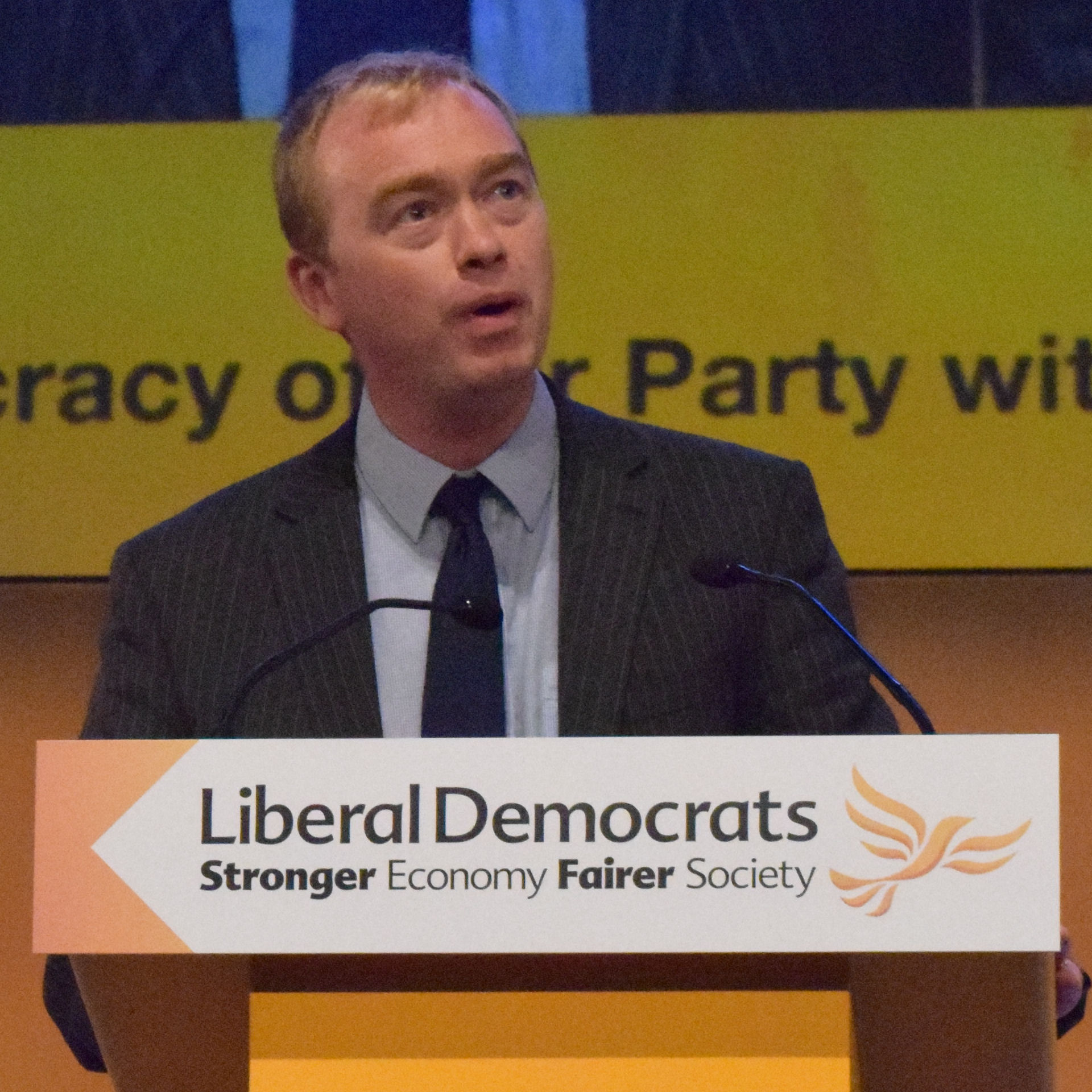
Tim Farron

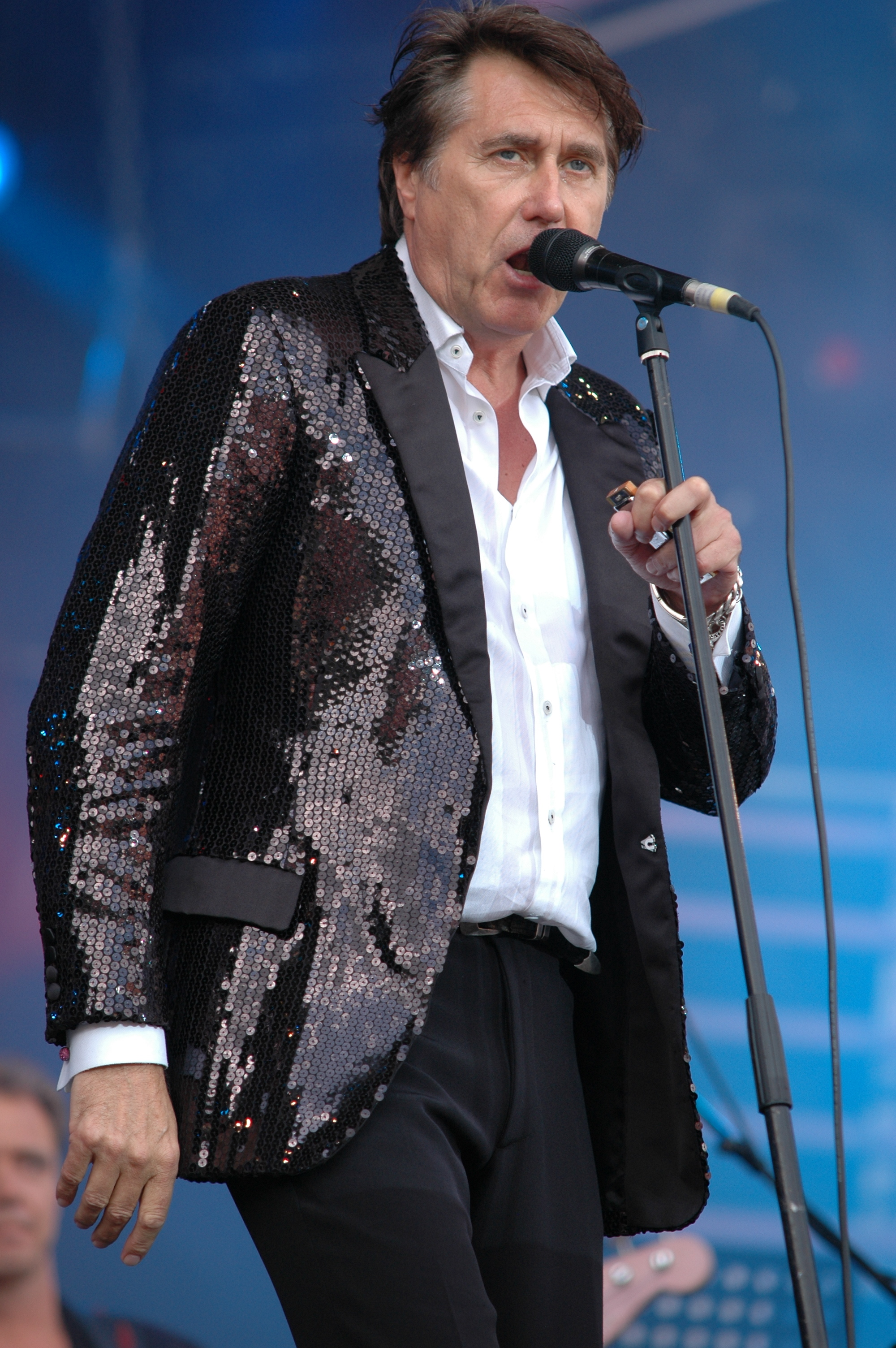
Bryan Ferry

- U. A. Fanthorpe - poet
- Frank Farmer - medical physicist; professor of medical physics at Newcastle University in 1966
- Terry Farrell - architect
- Tim Farron - former Liberal Democrat leader and MP for Westmorland and Lonsdale
- Ian Fells - professor
- Andy Fenby - rugby player
- Bryan Ferry - singer, songwriter and musician, member of Roxy Music and solo artist; studied fine art
- E. J. Field - neuroscientist, director of the university's Demyelinating Disease Unit
- John Niemeyer Findlay - philosopher
- John Fitzgerald - computer scientist
- Vicky Forster - cancer researcher
- Maximilian Fosh - YouTuber and independent candidate in the 2021 London mayoral election.
- Rose Frain - artist

== G ==
- Hugh Grosvenor, 7th Duke of Westminster - aristocrat, billionaire, businessman and landowner
- Peter Gibbs - television weather presenter
- Ken Goodall - rugby player
- Peter Gooderham - British ambassador
- Michael Goodfellow - Professor in Microbial Systematics
- Robert Goodwill - politician
- Richard Gordon - author
- Thomas George Greenwell - National Conservative Member of Parliament

== H ==
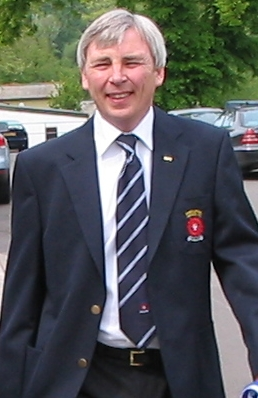
Ken Hodcroft

Bill Hopkins

- Andrew Haigh - film director
- Sarah Hainsworth - Pro-Vice-Chancellor and Executive Dean of the School of Engineering and Applied Science at Aston University
- Reginald Hall - endocrinologist, Professor of Medicine (1970–1980)
- Alex Halliday - Professor of Geochemistry, University of Oxford
- Richard Hamilton - artist
- Vicki L. Hanson - computer scientist; honorary doctorate in 2017
- Rupert Harden - professional rugby union player
- Tim Head - artist
- Patsy Healey - professor
- Alastair Heathcote - rower
- Dorothy Heathcote - academic
- Adrian Henri - 'Mersey Scene' poet and painter
- Stephen Hepburn - politician
- Jack Heslop-Harrison - botanist
- Tony Hey - computer scientist; honorary doctorate 2007
- Stuart Hill - author
- Jean Hillier - professor
- Ken Hodcroft - Chairman of Hartlepool United; founder of Increased Oil Recovery
- Robert Holden - landscape architect
- Bill Hopkins - composer
- David Horrobin - entrepreneur
- Debbie Horsfield - writer of dramas, including Cutting It
- John House - geographer
- Paul Hudson - weather presenter
- Philip Hunter - educationist
- Ronald Hunt – Art Historian who was librarian at the Art Department
- Anya Hurlbert - visual neuroscientist

== I ==
- Charles Innes-Ker - Marquess of Bowmont and Cessford
- Mark Isherwood - politician
- Jonathan Israel - historian

== J ==
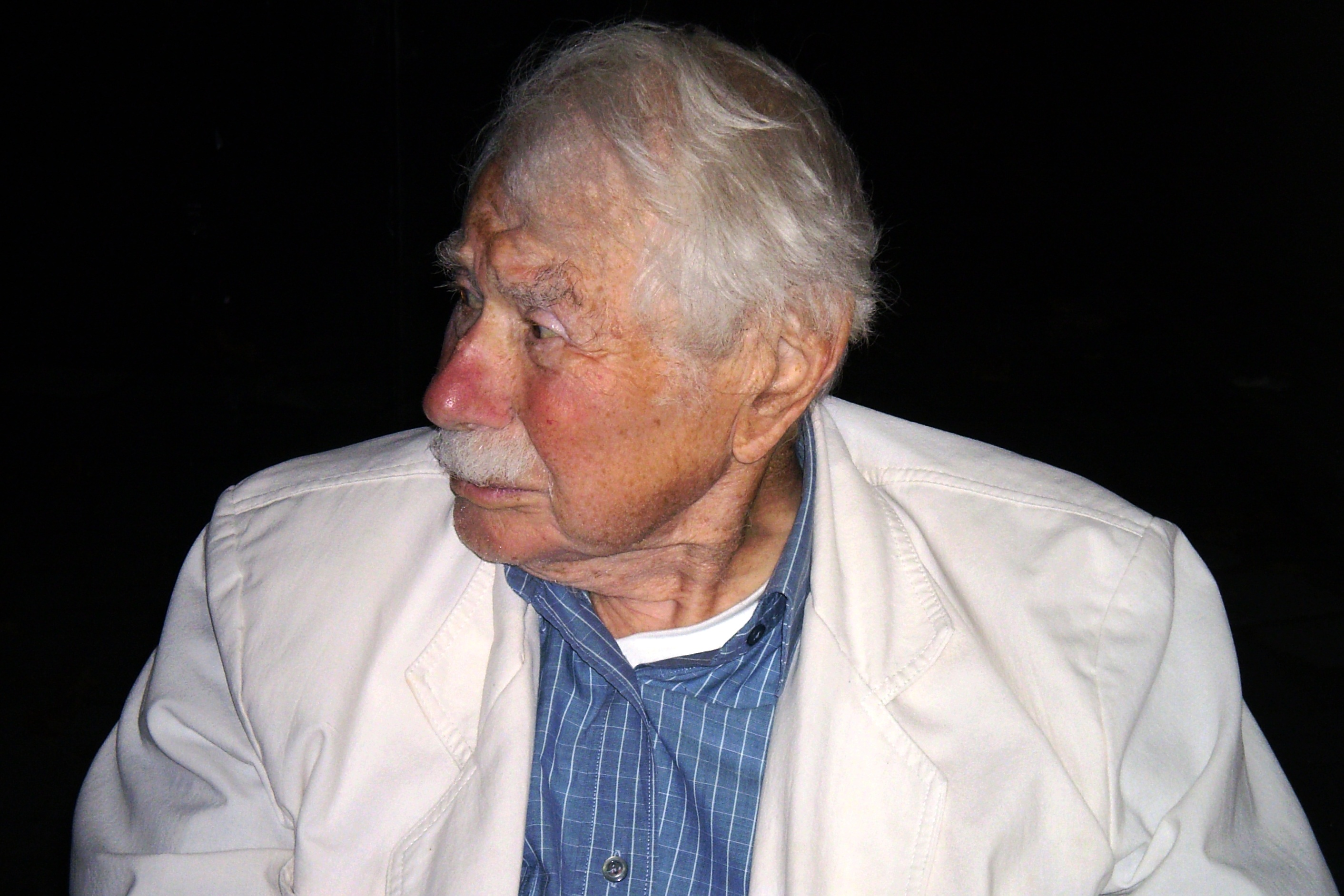
George Neil Jenkins

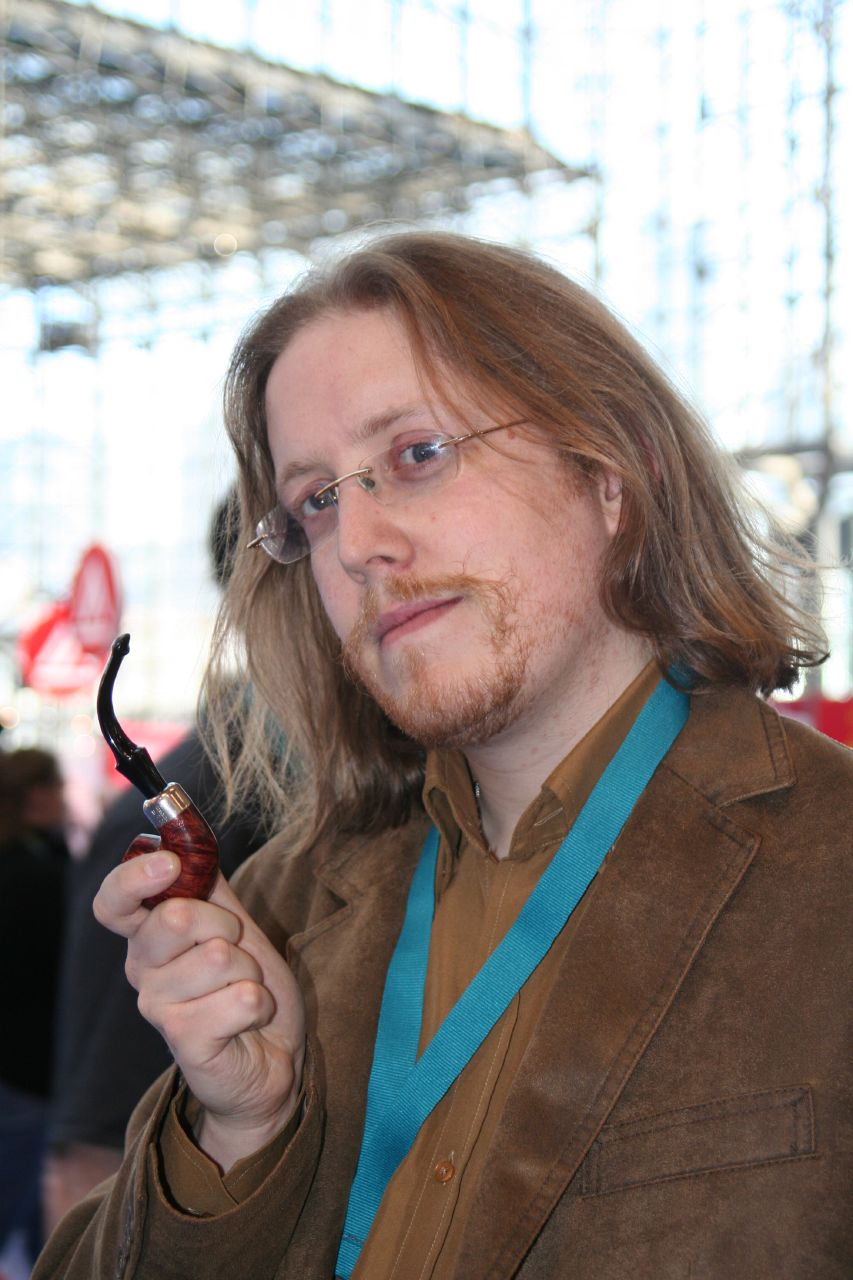
Rich Johnston

- Alan J. Jamieson - marine biologist
- George Neil Jenkins - medical researcher
- Caroline Johnson - Conservative Member of Parliament
- Wilko Johnson - guitarist with 1970s British rhythm and blues band Dr. Feelgood
- Rich Johnston - comic book writer and cartoonist
- Anna Jones - businesswoman
- Cliff Jones - computer scientist
- Colin Jones - historian
- David E. H. Jones - chemist
- Francis R. Jones - poetry translator and Reader in Translation Studies
- Phil Jones - climatologist
- Michael Jopling, Baron Jopling - Member of the House of Lords and the Conservative Party
- Wilfred Josephs - dentist and composer

== K ==
- Panayiotis Kalorkoti - artist; studied B.A. (Hons) in Fine Art (1976–80); Bartlett Fellow in the Visual Arts (1988)
- Jackie Kay - poet, novelist, Professor of Creative Writing
- Paul Kennedy - historian of international relations and grand strategy
- Mark Khangure - neuroradiologist
- Martin Luther King Jr. - civil rights leader; honorary graduate. In November 1967, MLK made a 24-hour trip to the United Kingdom to receive an honorary Doctorate of Civil Law from Newcastle University, becoming the first African American the institution had recognised in this way.

== L ==
- Joy Labinjo - artist
- Henrike Lähnemann - German medievalist
- Dave Leadbetter - politician
- Lim Boon Heng - Singapore Minister
- Lin Hsin Hsin - IT inventor, artist, poet and composer
- Anne Longfield - children's campaigner, former Children's Commissioner for England
- Keith Ludeman - businessman
- Rebecca Louise Law - artist

== M ==
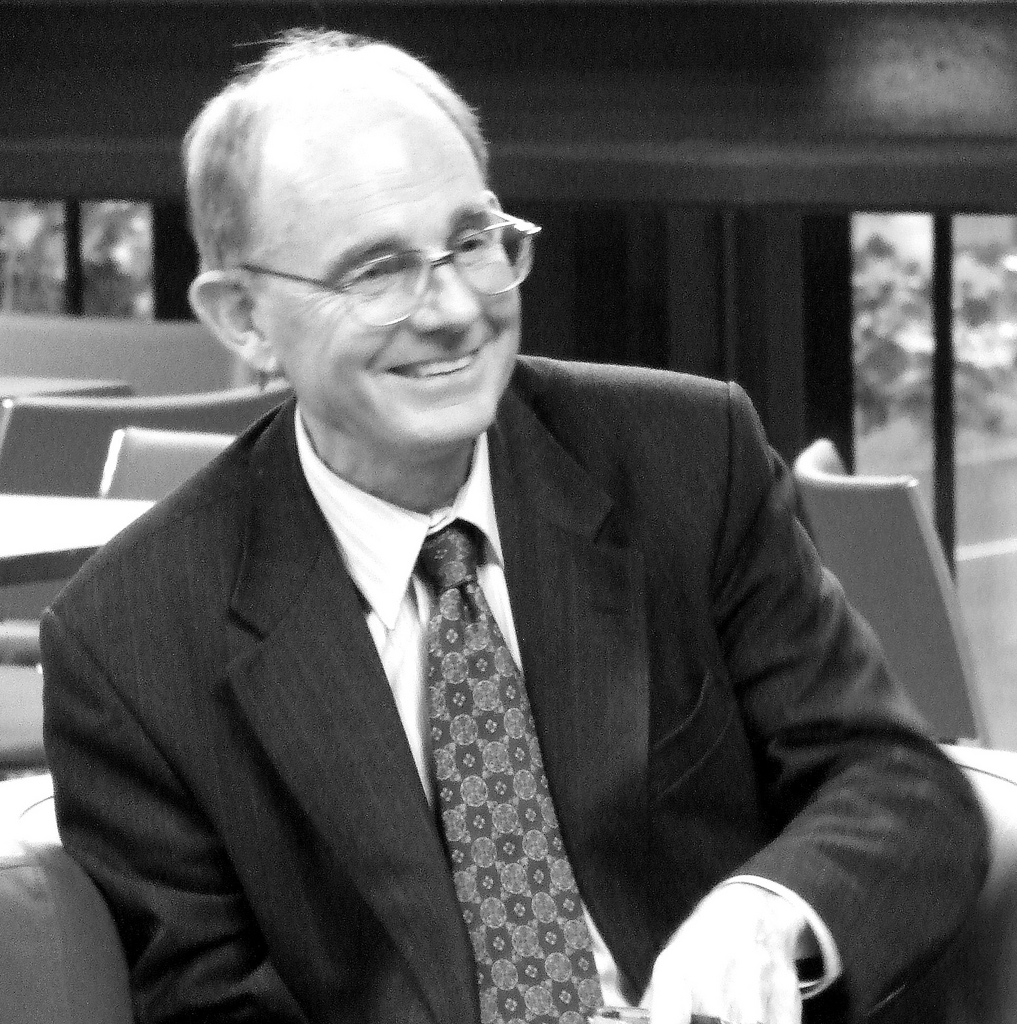
Chris Mullin

- Laurie Macmillan (10 May 1947 – 8 October 2001) was a BBC Radio 4 newsreader and continuity announcer.
- Jack Mapanje - writer and poet
- Milton Margai - first prime minister of Sierra Leone (medical degree from the Durham College of Medicine, later Newcastle University Medical School)
- Laurence Martin - war studies writer
- Murray Martin, documentary and docudrama filmmaker, co-founder of Amber Film & Photography Collective
- Adrian Martineau – medical researcher and professor of respiratory Infection and immunity at Queen Mary University of London
- Carl R. May - sociologist
- Tom May - professional rugby union player, now with Northampton Saints, and capped by England
- Kate McCann – journalist and television presenter
- Ian G. McKeith – professor of Old Age Psychiatry
- John Anthony McGuckin - Orthodox Christian scholar, priest, and poet
- Wyl Menmuir - novelist
- Zia Mian - physicist
- Richard Middleton - musicologist
- Mary Midgley - moral philosopher
- G.C.J. Midgley - philosopher
- John E. M. Midgley (1935–2023), British biochemist
- Moein Moghimi - biochemist and nanoscientist
- Hermann Moisl - linguist
- Anthony Michaels-Moore - Operatic Baritone
- Joanna Moncrieff - Critical Psychiatrist
- Theodore Morison - Principal of Armstrong College, Newcastle upon Tyne (1919–24)
- Andy Morrell - footballer
- Frank Moulaert - professor
- Mo Mowlam - former British Labour Party Member of Parliament, former Secretary of State for Northern Ireland, lecturer at Newcastle University
- Chris Mullin - former British Labour Party Member of Parliament, author, visiting fellow
- VA Mundella - College of Physical Science, 1884—1887; lecturer in physics at the College, 1891—1896: Professor of Physics at Northern Polytechnic Institute and Principal of Sunderland Technical College.
- Richard Murphy - architect

== N ==
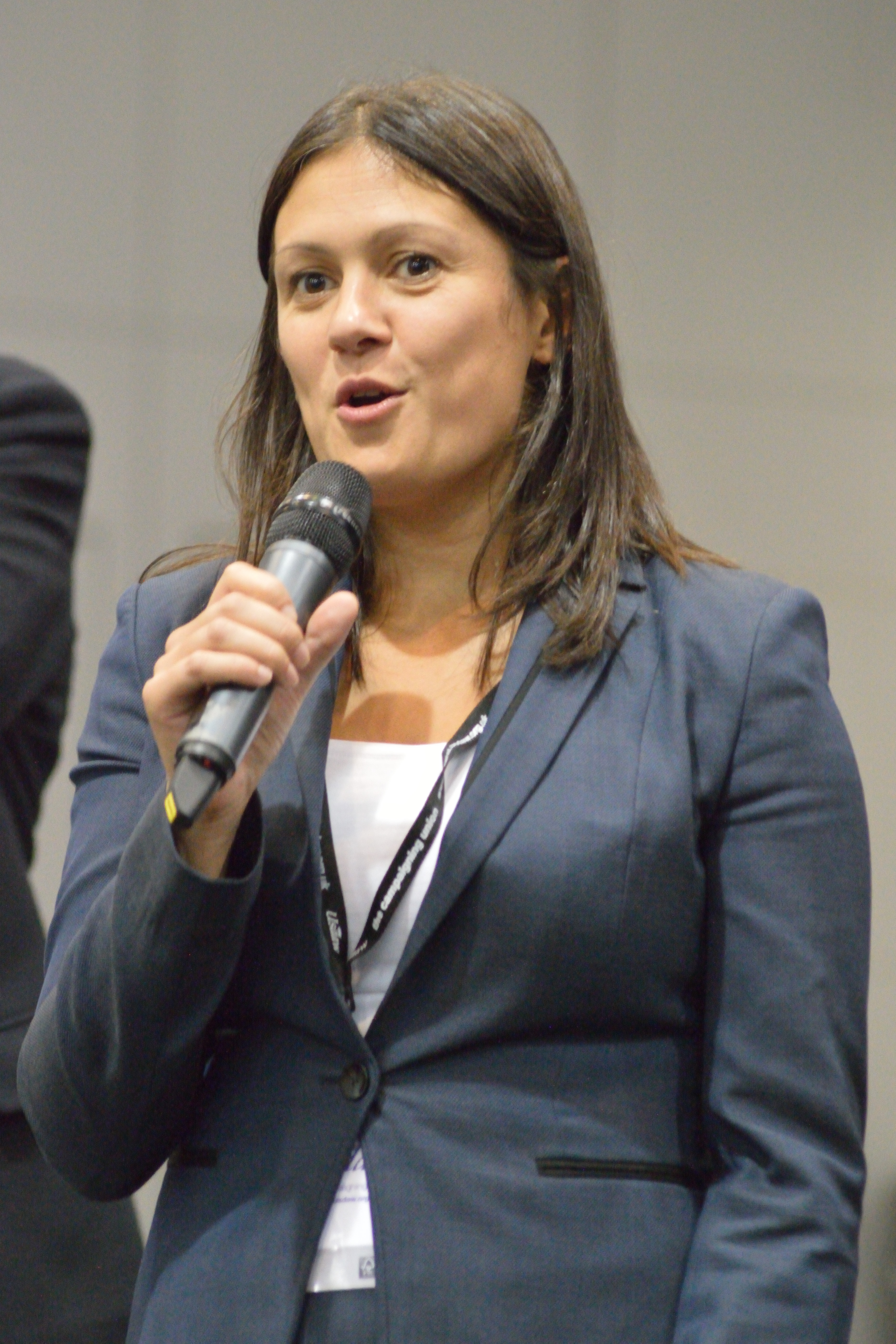
Lisa Nandy

- Lillian Mary Nabulime - Ugandan sculptor and lecturer
- Lisa Nandy - British Labour Party Member of Parliament, former Shadow Foreign Secretary
- Harash Narang - virologist and microbiologist
- Karim Nayernia - biomedical scientist
- Dianne Nelmes - TV producer

== O ==
- Sally O'Reilly - writer
- Mo O'Toole - former British Labour Party Member of European Parliament

== P ==
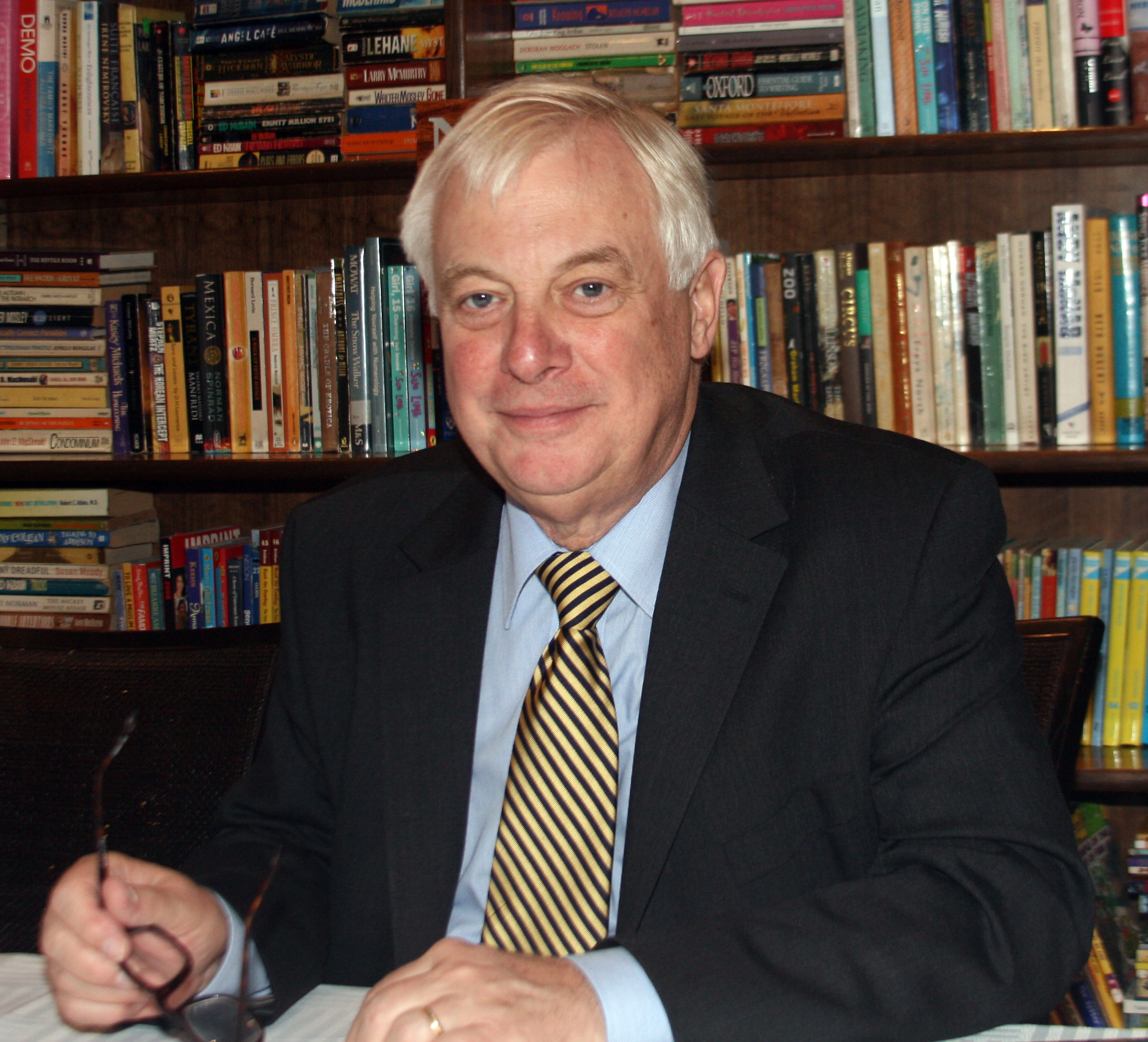
Chris Patten

- Ewan Page - founding director of the Newcastle University School of Computing and briefly acting vice-chancellor; later appointed vice-chancellor of the University of Reading
- Rachel Pain - academic
- Amanda Parker - Lord Lieutenant of Lancashire since 2023
- Geoff Parling - Leicester Tigers rugby player
- Chris Patten, Baron Patten of Barnes - British Conservative politician and Chancellor of the University (1999–2009)
- Mick Paynter - Cornish poet and Grandbard
- Robert A. Pearce - academic
- Hugh Percy, 10th Duke of Northumberland - Chancellor of the University (1964–1988)
- Ben Pimlott - political historian; PhD and lectureship at Newcastle University (1970–79)
- Robin Plackett - statistician
- Alan Plater - playwright and screenwriter
- Ruth Plummer - Professor of Experimental Cancer Medicine at the Northern Institute for Cancer Research and Fellow of the UK's Academy of Medical Sciences.
- John Porter - musician
- Rob Powell - former London Broncos coach
- Stuart Prebble - former chief executive of ITV
- Oliver Proudlock - Made in Chelsea star; creator of Serge De Nîmes clothing line
- Mark Purnell - palaeontologist

== Q ==
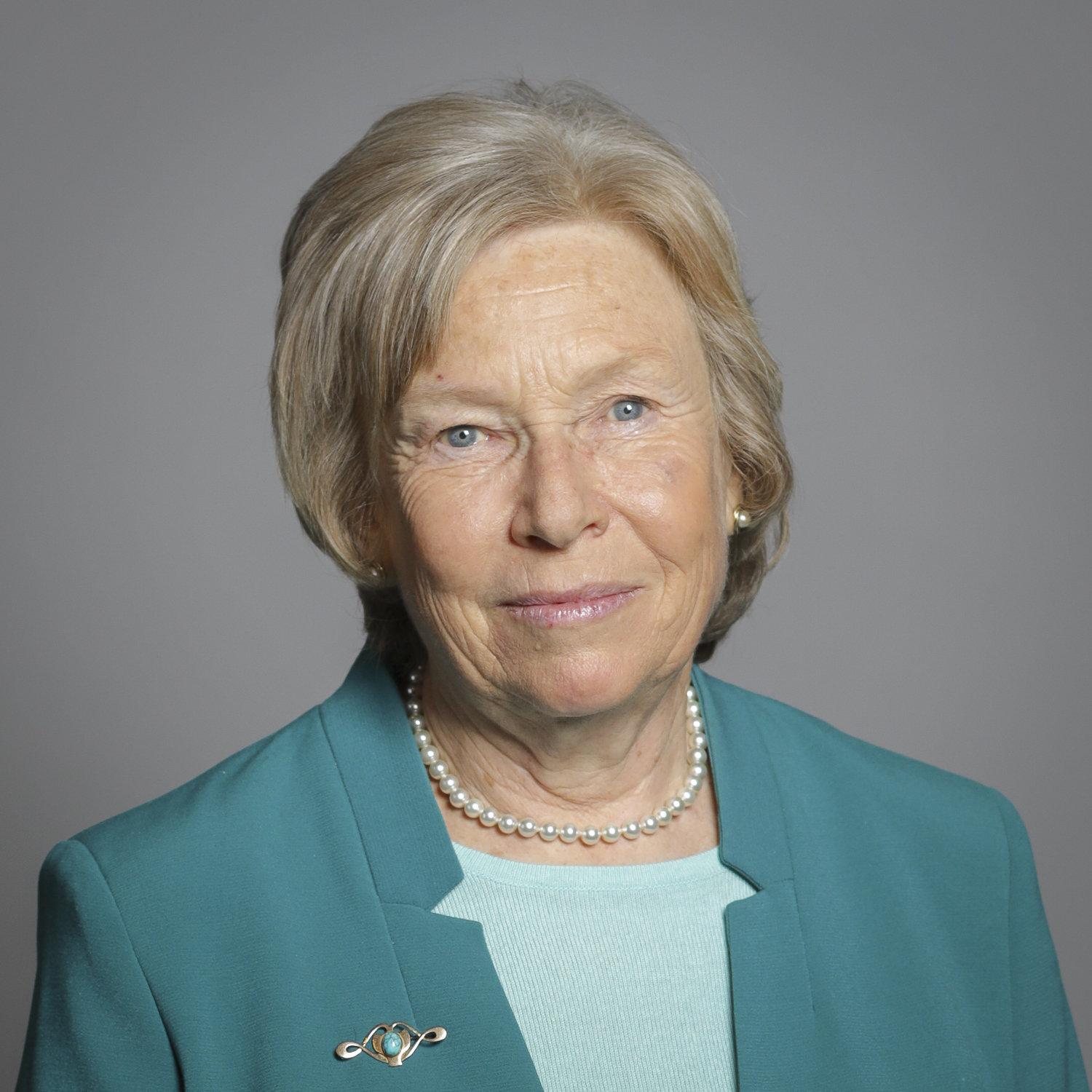
Baroness Quin

- Pirzada Qasim - Pakistani scholar, Vice-Chancellor of the University of Karachi
- Joyce Quin, Baroness Quin - politician

== R ==
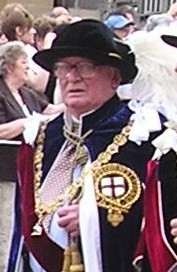
Matthew White Ridley, 4th Viscount Ridley

- Andy Raleigh - Rugby League player for Wakefield Trinity Wildcats
- Brian Randell - computer scientist
- Rupert Mitford, 6th Baron Redesdale - Liberal Democrat spokesman in the House of Lords for International Development
- Alastair Reynolds - novelist, former research astronomer with the European Space Agency
- Ben Rice - author
- Lewis Fry Richardson - mathematician, studied at the Durham College of Science in Newcastle
- Matthew White Ridley, 4th Viscount Ridley - Chancellor of the University 1988-1999
- Colin Riordan - VC of Cardiff University, Professor of German Studies (1988–2006)
- Susie Rodgers - British Paralympic swimmer
- Neil Rollinson - poet
- Johanna Ropner - Lord lieutenant of North Yorkshire
- John Rushby - computer scientist
- Camilla Rutherford - actress

== S ==
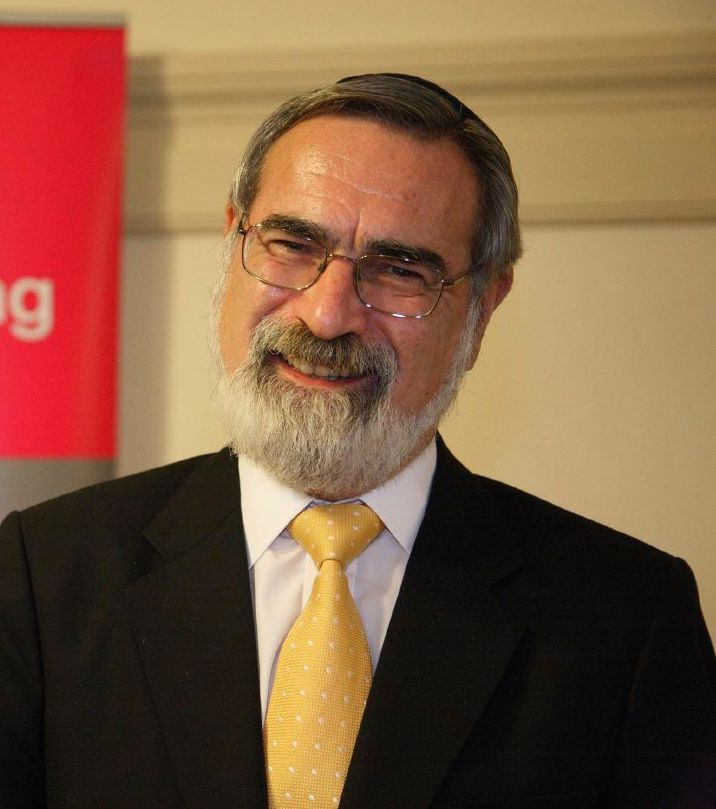
Jonathan Sacks

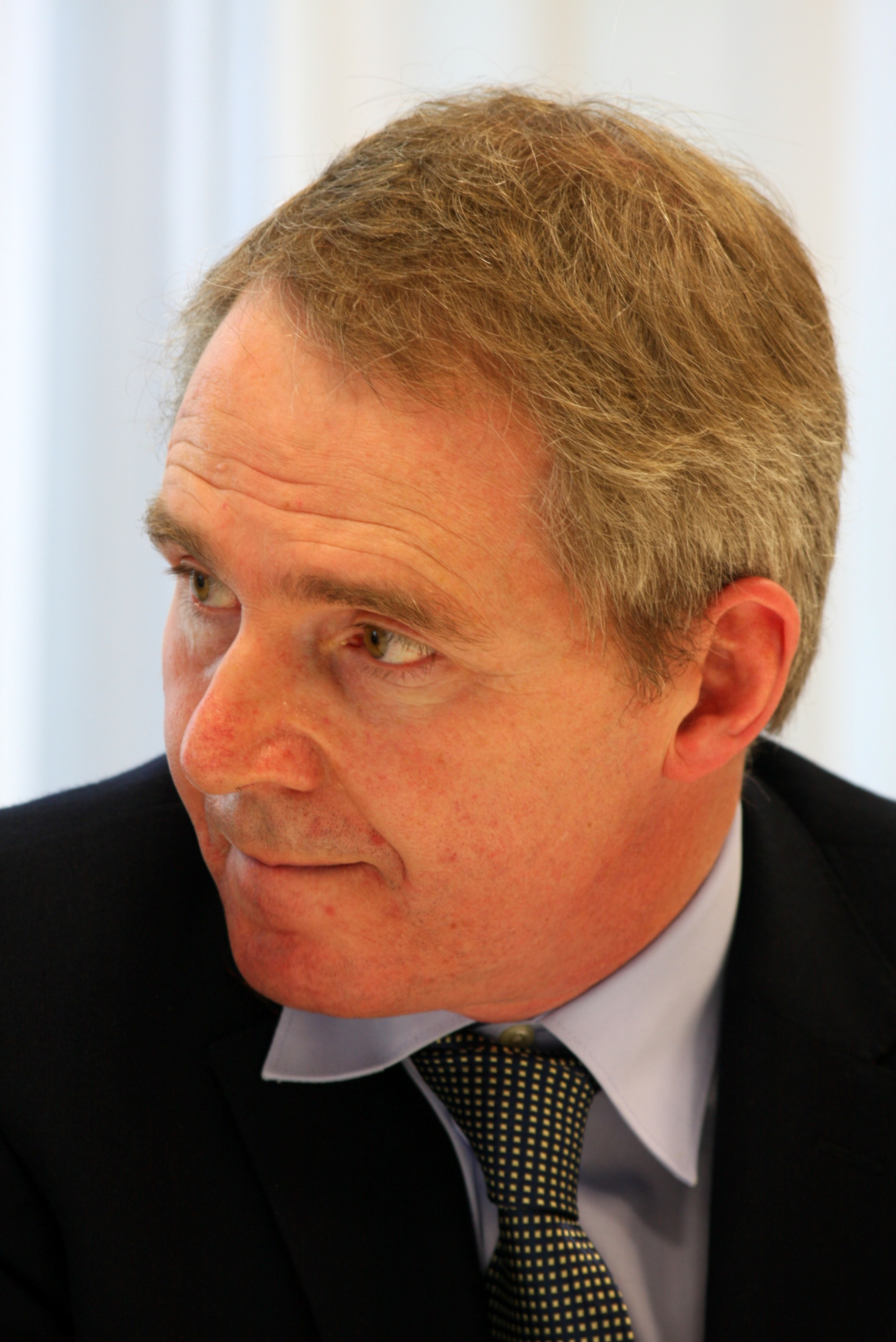
Nigel Shadbolt

- Jonathan Sacks - former Chief Rabbi of the United Hebrew Congregations of the Commonwealth
- Ross Samson - Scottish rugby union footballer; studied history
- Helen Scales - marine biologist, broadcaster, and writer
- William Scammell - poet
- Fred B. Schneider - computer scientist; honorary doctorate in 2003
- Sean Scully - painter
- Nigel Shadbolt - computer scientist
- Tom Shakespeare - geneticist
- Jo Shapcott - poet
- James Shapiro - Canadian surgeon and scientist
- Jack Shepherd - actor and playwright
- Mark Shucksmith - professor
- Chris Simms - crime thriller novel author
- Lizeth Sloot - biomechanist
- Iain Smith - Scottish politician
- Paul Smith - singer, Maxïmo Park
- John Snow - discoverer of cholera transmission through water; leader in the adoption of anaesthesia; one of the 8 students enrolled on the very first term of the Medical School
- Ed Stafford - explorer, walked the length of the Amazon River
- Chris Steele-Perkins - photographer
- Chris Stevenson - academic
- Di Stewart - Sky Sports News reader
- Diana Stöcker - German CDU Member of Parliament
- Miodrag Stojković - genetics researcher
- Miriam Stoppard - physician, author and agony aunt
- Charlie van Straubenzee - businessman and investment executive
- Peter Straughan - playwright and short story writer

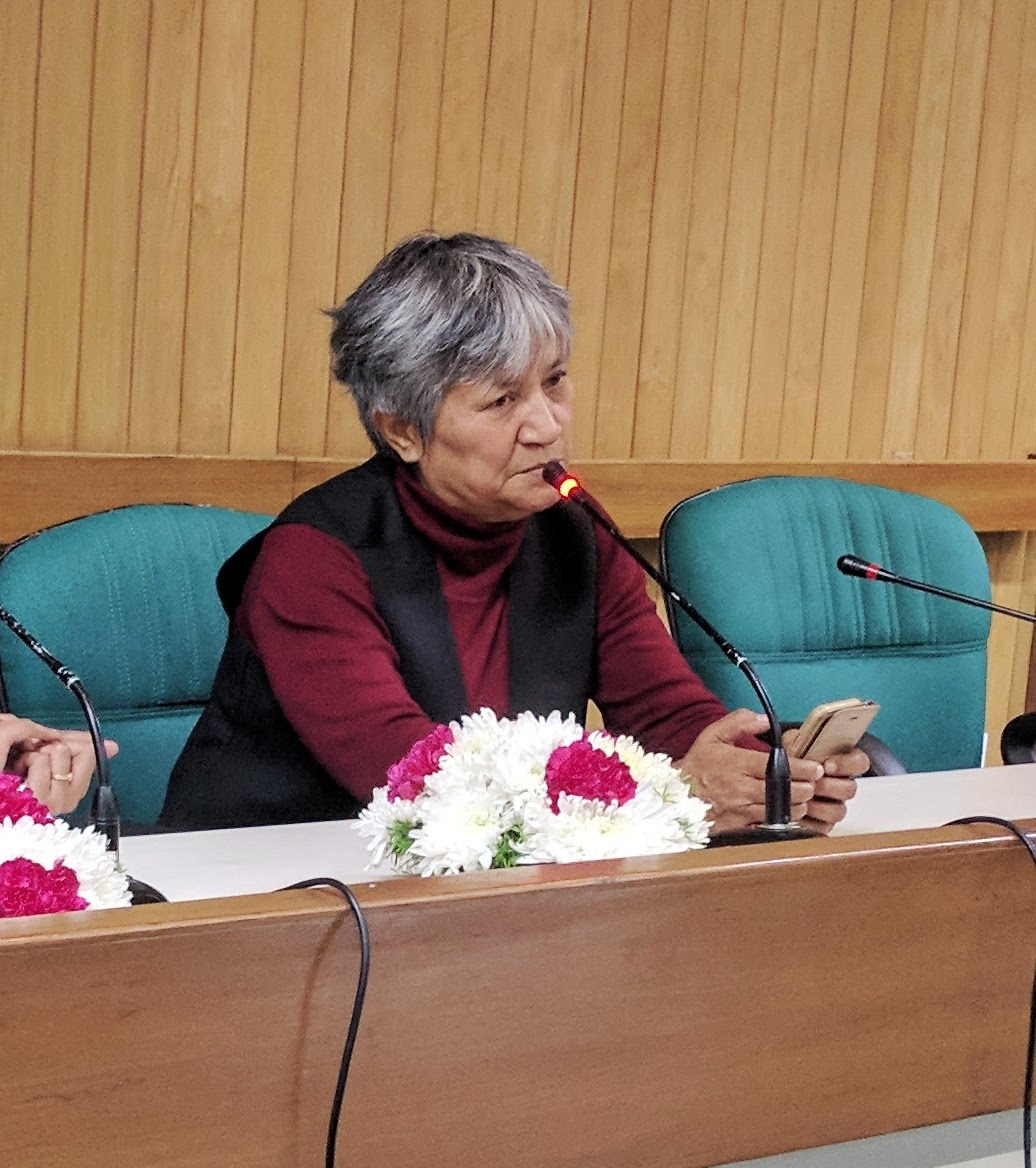
Hisila Yami

== T ==
- Mathew Tait - rugby union footballer
- Eric Thomas - academic
- David Tibet - cult musician and poet
- Archis Tiku - bassist, Maxïmo Park
- James Tooley - professor
- Elsie Tu - politician
- Maurice Tucker - sedimentologist
- Paul Tucker - member of Lighthouse Family
- George Grey Turner - surgeon
- Ronald F. Tylecote - archaeologist

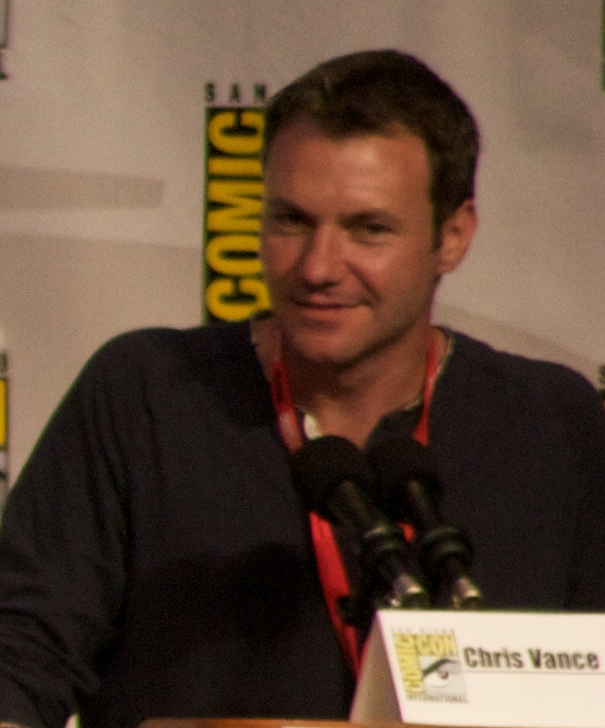
Chris Vance

== V ==
- Chris Vance - actor in Prison Break and All Saints
- Géza Vermes - scholar
- Geoff Vigar - lecturer
- Hugh Vyvyan - rugby union player

== W ==
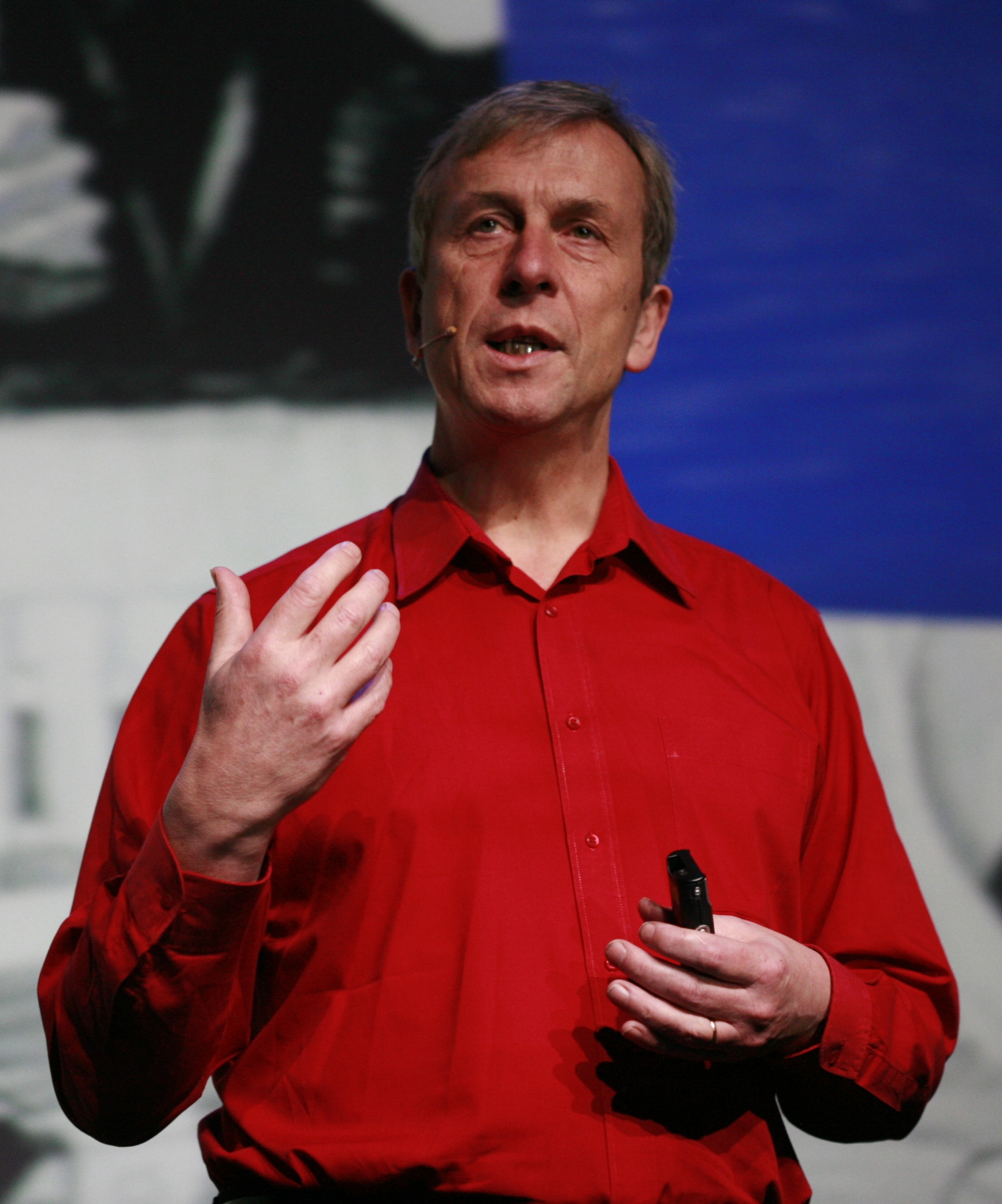
Kevin Warwick

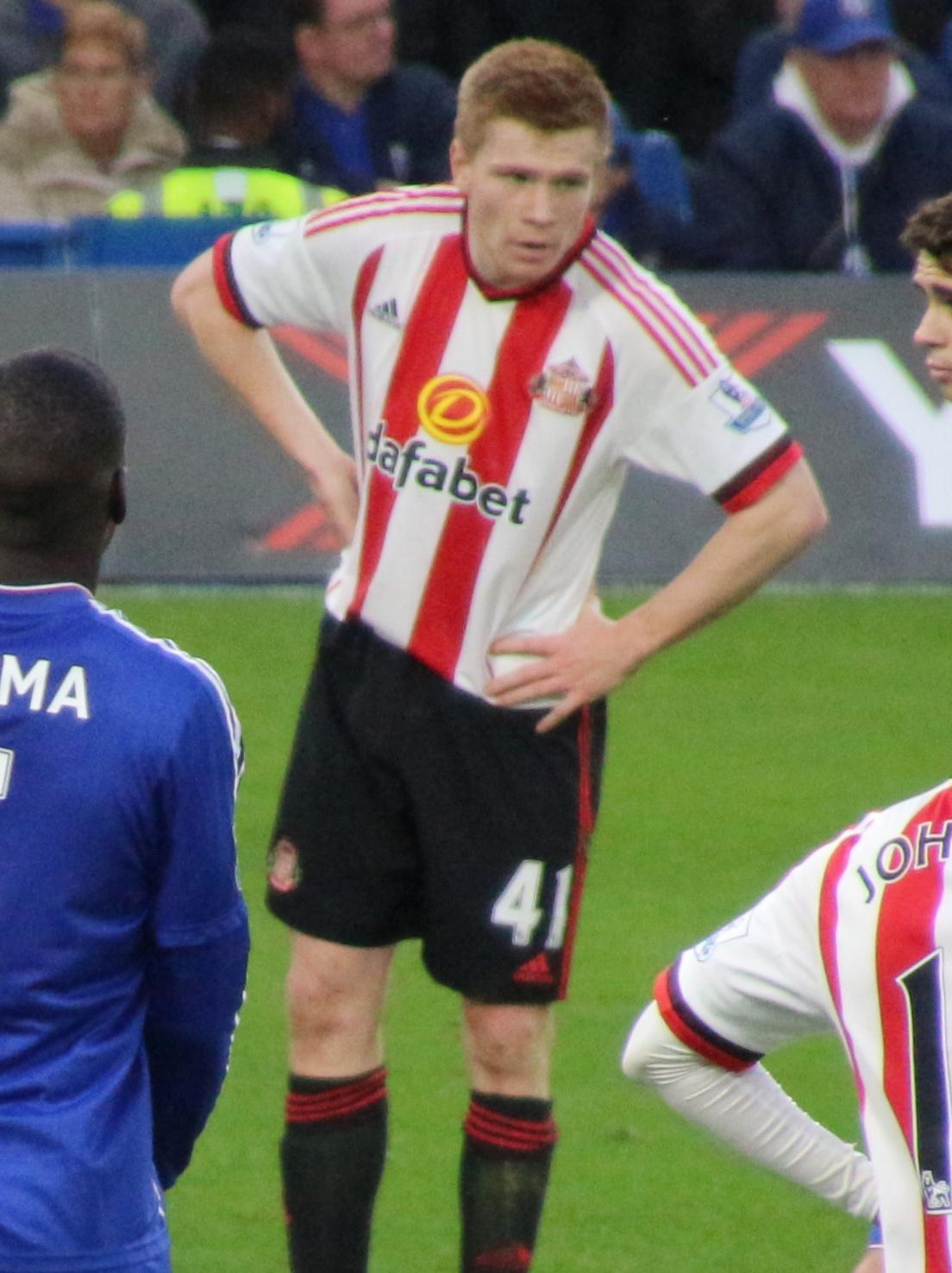
Duncan Watmore

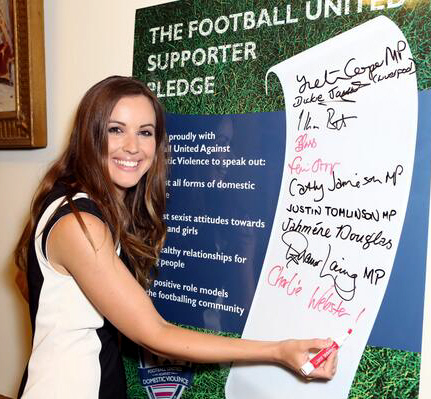
Charlie Webster

- Alick Walker - palaeontologist
- Matthew Walker - Professor of Neuroscience and Psychology at the University of California, Berkeley
- Lord Walton of Detchant - physician; President of the GMC, BMA, RSM; Warden of Green College, Oxford (1983–1989)
- Kevin Warwick - Professor of Cybernetics; former Lecturer in Electrical & Electronic Engineering
- Duncan Watmore - footballer at Millwall F.C.
- Mary Webb - artist
- Charlie Webster - television sports presenter
- Li Wei - Chair of Applied Linguistics at UCL Institute of Education, University College London
- Joseph Joshua Weiss - Professor of Radiation Chemistry
- Robert Westall - children's writer, twice winner of Carnegie Medal
- Thomas Stanley Westoll - Fellow of the Royal Society
- Gillian Whitehead - composer
- William Whitfield - architect, later designed the Hadrian Building and the Northern Stage
- Claire Williams - motorsport executive
- Zoe Williams - sportswoman, worked on Gladiators
- Donald I. Williamson - planktologist and carcinologist
- John Willis - Royal Air Force officer and council member of the University
- Lukas Wooller - keyboard player, Maxïmo Park
- Graham Wylie - co-founder of the Sage Group; studied Computing Science & Statistics BSc and graduated in 1980; awarded an honorary doctorate in 2004

== Y ==
- Hisila Yami, Nepalese politician and former Minister of Physical Planning and Works (Government of Nepal)
- John Yorke - Controller of Continuing Drama; Head of Independent Drama at the BBC
- Martha Young-Scholten - linguist
- Paul Younger - hydrogeologist
