= Vainikka =

Vainikka is a Finnish surname. Notable people with the surname include:

- Riitta Uosukainen (born 1942), née Vainikka, Finnish politician
- Anne Vainikka (1958–2018), Finnish linguist
