= Love Home Swap =

Holiday home exchange

- Founded: 2011; 15 years ago
- Founder: Debbie Wosskow
- Headquarters: London, England
- Area served: Worldwide
- Key people: Celia Pronto, Managing Director
- Products: Homestay
- Services: Home exchange
- Number of employees: 40 (2021)
- Parent: Travel + Leisure Co.
- Website: www.lovehomeswap.com

Love Home Swap is a subscription-based, peer-to-peer holiday home exchange or home swapping website. Members of the website swap homes with each other, either simultaneously or using a points system. The company is based in London, United Kingdom. Love Home Swap was acquired by Travel + Leisure Co. (formerly Wyndham Worldwide Corporation) in August 2017. In March of 2023, HomeExchange.com purchased Love Home Swap.

== History ==
Love Home Swap was founded in 2011 by Debbie Wosskow OBE after being inspired by the film The Holiday featuring Kate Winslet and Cameron Diaz. The company was founded during a phase of rapid growth in the sharing economy or collaborative consumption space, of which Wosskow was a strong proponent.

- 2014 Love Home Swap acquired 1st Home Exchange
- 2015 Received first investment from Wyndham (now operating as Travel + Leisure Co.)
- 2015 Acquired Dutch rival Home For Exchange
- August 2017 Love Home Swap was acquired by Travel + Leisure Co. for $53 million
- March 2023 Love Home Swap was purchased by HomeExchange.com.
