= Home exchange =

Form of lodging

Home exchange, also known as house swapping, is a form of lodging in which two parties agree to offer each other homestays for a set period of time. Since no monetary exchange takes place, it is a form of barter, collaborative consumption, and sharing. Home exchange can cover any type of residence including apartments, houses, holiday cottages, boats, or recreational vehicles. It can include an exchange of the entire home or just a room. The length of the swap can vary from a weekend to over a year. The swap can be simultaneous or non simultaneous. Home exchanges are usually arranged via specific types of social networking services, most of which charge a fee.

Like all homestays, home exchanges offer several advantages over hotel lodging, including a lower cost and opportunities for cultural diplomacy and friendship.

Some networks offer the ability to collect a security deposit.

Summer is traditionally the peak season for house swapping, as families travel during school breaks.

== History ==
Organized home exchange originated in 1953 with the creation of Intervac International by a group of European teachers looking to travel internationally economically during their summer breaks. That same year, teacher David Ostroff created a home exchange network called "Vacation Exchange Club" (now HomeLink) in New York City.

In 1992, Ed Kushins started what is now HomeExchange.com after a home exchange experience in Washington D.C. In 1995, he moved the business to the internet.

In 1999, home exchange was estimated to be growing at 15-20% per year. In 2010, home exchange networks were continuing to experience rapid growth.

== Academic research ==
Home exchange has been a subject of sociological studies, geographical and tourism studies, culture studies and peace studies. In 2008 it became also the subject of information and information security studies.

=== Information studies ===
The 2008 study by Julia Maria Koszewska explored "the role of information in modern society, particularly on access to information and information management as prerequisites for participative and democratic society". This was done by study of history of home exchange movement and its initiatives, websites, and functionality expressed by users' experiences shared with the researcher.

=== Participant demographics ===
Participants tend to be well-educated and well-traveled. Home exchanges are popular with teachers during school holidays, particularly during the summer, and with senior citizens, who have more time to travel.

A 2013 study by the University of Bergamo showed that participants were more skewed to higher age groups, with 28.3% aged 45–54, 18.7% 65+ and only 5.9% under age 34. The study showed that 84.3% of respondents seek out museums and nature, 67% value environmentally-friendly tourism, and 98% express interest in cultural heritage. Fair trade food (63%) and organic food (73%) are also important. The study noted the strong degree of trust necessary in collaborative consumption, with 75% agreeing that most people are trustworthy. 93% were satisfied with their experience, with 81% having swapped homes more than once.

== Popular culture ==
Home exchange was the subject of the 2006 romantic comedy The Holiday, directed by Nancy Meyers and starring Kate Winslet, Cameron Diaz, Jack Black and Jude Law.

== Permanent home exchange ==
There are several situations in which people have exchanged homes permanently:

- During the subprime mortgage crisis, home exchange was used to help buyers and sellers when financing was harder to obtain.
- Mutual exchange is a mechanism for tenants of public housing in the United Kingdom to swap their homes.
- During ethnic conflicts, such as in Iraq in 2006, members of ethnic minorities have swapped homes with friends who are members of different ethnic minorities in a different neighborhood. The goal is that each minority resident ends up in a neighborhood where their ethnicity is in the majority, thus reducing violence.
