= Debbie Wosskow =

British entrepreneur

Deborah Jane Wosskow CBE is a multi exit entrepreneur, Chair, Non Executive Director and Business Advisor from Sheffield, UK. She is the former CEO of Love Home Swap, a subscription-based home exchange business, which she sold for $53m to Wyndham Destination Networks in July 2017. Debbie co-founded AllBright, a club and community that celebrates and connects women at work. Wosskow is also an influential advocate of the sharing economy and is the former Chair of Sharing Economy UK. In 2015 she led the independent government review ‘Unlocking the Sharing Economy’ - also known as the Wosskow Report. She is a Member of the Mayor of London's Business Advisory Board and sits on the Board of the Women’s Fiction Prize. In 2016, she was awarded an OBE for services to business.

== Early life ==
Wosskow was born in Sheffield, South Yorkshire in February 1974. and later moved to Leeds at the age of ten.

== Entrepreneurial success ==
By the age of 25 Wosskow had co-founded Mantra PR with Lawrence Dore. In 2001 she was selected as one of Management Today’s 35 Women Under 35, while Mantra was sold to the Loewy Group for several million dollars in 2007. In 2008 Wosskow co-founded Maidthorn Partners, an investment and advisory firm aimed particularly at assisting media and tech companies.

In 2011 Wosskow launched Love Home Swap, which is now the world’s leading home-swapping platform. After an unsatisfactory hotel-based holiday with her two young children, Wosskow watched The Holiday, starring Kate Winslet and Cameron Diaz, and was inspired to create a business that would enable subscribers from across the world to exchange their homes. An investment of £7.5m from Wyndham Worldwide, along with the acquisition of 1stHomeExchange and HomeForExchange, have helped Love Home Swap to grow exponentially – its website now features more than 100,000 homes from 150 countries.

In 2017 Wosskow sold Love Home Swap to Wyndham for $53 million.

== Supporting female entrepreneurs and AllBright ==
As an Angel Investor, Wosskow has frequently backed female-founded companies and is outspoken about the need to improve gender imbalances in entrepreneurial activity as a way of creating greater equality and unlocking new sources of economic growth. In 2018, she teamed up with Anna Jones, then CEO of Hearst Magazines, UK, to co-found AllBright, an education and networking organisation designed to provide a platform, skills and connections to working women across the UK. AllBright comprises Members’ clubs, Academy and Live Events to celebrate and connect working women.

== Advocate of the sharing economy ==
In 2014 the British government commissioned Wosskow to compile a 60,000-word report, entitled ‘Unlocking the Sharing Economy,’ for the Department for Business, Innovation and Skills.

In 2016 Wosskow launched Sharing Economy UK, “a self-appointed and member-funded trade body” that seeks “to support and monitor businesses working within the nascent industry”. SEUK’s members include Airbnb, Zipcar and Liftshare. As chair of SEUK Wosskow is also working with Oxford University and PricewaterhouseCoopers to develop the world’s first trustmark for the sharing economy.

Wosskow also currently sits on the Mayor of London's Business Advisory Board.

== Championing midlife women and The Better Menopause ==
Following a health scare in July 2022, which saw Wosskow hospitalised and treated with eight months of antibiotics, she was told by doctors that she had also entered perimenopause. After being medically advised to take probiotics, she was unable to find anything on the market to repair both her gut microbiome and balance fluctuating hormones. After extensive research, she teamed up with AllBright business partner Anna Jones again to form The Better Menopause. With a team including Dr Shahzadi Harper as resident doctor and Nutritional Therapist Joanna Lyall the business launched science-driven supplements Better Gut, a probiotic for women in perimenopause and menopause, followed by Better Night for insomnia, anxiety and sleep disturbance.

== Podcast ==
Wosskow launched Grit & Grace with Debbie Wosskow in January 2024 as a movement to change the narrative around midlife; interviewing celebrity guests and experts to challenge the stigma around women during this stage of life, by celebrating wisdom, humour, resilience and reinventions.

== Invest In Women Taskforce ==
Wosskow is co-chair of The Invest in Women Taskforce, alongside Hannah Bernard, head of business banking at Barclays. Taskforce is an industry-led, government backed initiative with a mission to make the UK the best place in the world to be a female entrepreneur.

Wosskow was instrumental in leading Taskforce to exceed its initial ambitious goal of creating one of the world’s largest investment pools of £250m for female-led and mixed businesses. Backed by Chancellor Rachel Reeves in its mission to unlock future economic growth: if women started and scaled businesses at the same rate as men, it would deliver a potential £250 billion boost to the UK economy.

The Invest in Women Taskforce investment pool will be deployed via female investment decision-makers across the UK, recognising that female investors are twice as likely to invest in female-led and mixed businesses, breaking down the systemic barriers faced by women entrepreneurs and investors alike.

== Advisory, trustee and board positions ==
Wosskow has been a Non Executive Director for broadcaster Channel 4 since December 2023. She is a Senior Advisor at management consultancy McKinsey & Company. Wosskow is Board Trustee and Chair of Development Board at The Women's Prize for Fiction.
