= HomeExchange.com =

French website

HomeExchange
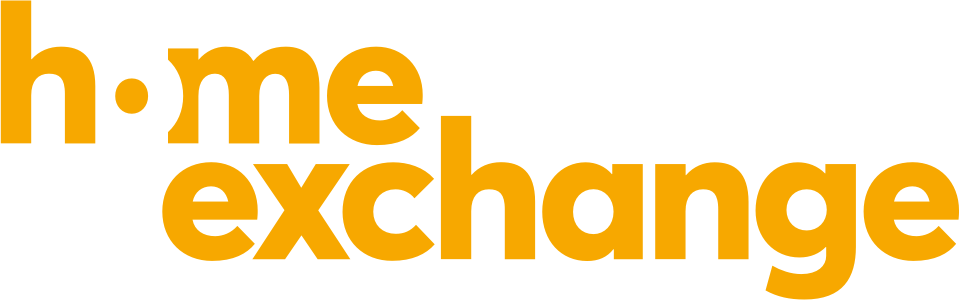
- Headquarters: Cambridge, Massachusetts, United States of America; Paris, France
- Area served: Global
- Founder: Ed Kushins
- Key people: Emmanuel Arnaud, CEO; Charles-Edouard Girard, Chairman
- Products: Homestay
- Services: Home exchange
- Website: www.homeexchange.com
- Launched: 1996; 30 years ago

HomeExchange is a network that facilitates home exchanges.

Born of the merger between GuesttoGuest and HomeExchange.com, is a platform for the exchange of houses and apartments between private individuals. The platform is owned by Tukazza.

== Concept ==
HomeExchange brings together private individuals who wish to exchange their house or apartment for short or long stays. Each house is assigned a value in points, called GuestPoints. Members can make reciprocal or non-reciprocal exchanges with GuestPoints. GuestPoints are earned by hosting guests in one's home, and used by visiting other members' homes. To finalize an exchange, an annual membership is required (175 EUR or 235 USD per year for unlimited exchanges).

== History ==
Ed Kushins first came up with the idea of starting a home exchange service back in 1992, after he and his family made their first home exchange from Hermosa Beach, California, to Washington D.C. On this trip, he learned that staying in a home, as opposed to a hotel, was not only more comfortable but offered a more enriching "living like a local" experience and was a lot more affordable. The HomeExchange club would later be launched that same year and was able to be navigated using a mail-ordered, printed directory. However, it would not become a web-based platform until 1996, when e-commerce was gaining popularity.

It is currently unknown what the site originally looked like on its launch date since web.archive.org can only trace it to 1998, despite the site being founded in 1996.

In 2006, HomeExchange.com was featured and promoted in the romantic comedy "The Holiday", produced and directed by Nancy Meyers.

In March 2017, GuestToGuest merged with HomeExchange.com, and since 2019 continued under that name. GuestToGuest's founder, Emmanuel Arnaud, then became the CEO of HomeExchange.com.

In March 2023, HomeExchange.com purchased its competitor, Love Home Swap.

== How it works ==
HomeExchange works on the principle of collaborative exchange. Unlike traditional rentals, the platform allows one to travel without paying for accommodation. All one has to do is make one's own accommodation available to other members. In exchange, one can stay in a member's home, either as a direct reciprocation or using a points system.

There are two types of exchange on HomeExchange:

- Reciprocal exchange: two members exchange houses or apartments at the same time or on different dates.
- Non-reciprocal exchange: If a direct exchange is not possible, HomeExchange uses a points system called GuestPoints. To acquire them, all one has to do is welcome members into one's own home. These GuestPoints can then be used to stay with another member.

The system works on an annual membership model which allows members to organize as many exchanges as they like at no additional cost. HomeExchange also emphasizes trust, with a profile verification system, a review system and guarantees to ensure the security of exchanges.

== HomeExchange around the world ==
In 2025, HomeExchange is said to be present in 155 countries. Since 2022, the platform has grown from 100,000 to 200,000 members and now counts 360,000 houses and apartments worldwide.

The countries where HomeExchange has the most members are France, the United States and Spain.

== HomeExchange's tourism model ==
Collaborative tourism

The HomeExchange concept is based on the desire to offer an authentic travel experience, favoring immersion in a local's home. A key player in collaborative tourism, HomeExchange encourages people to meet and share with each other.

In addition to exchanging houses and apartments for vacations, HomeExchange also offers to exchange other amenities such as cars and bicycles, although these are not covered by the platform's guarantees.

Increasingly popular, pet-sitting between private individuals is also possible on the platform, where some members offer their services when they go on vacation and in turn benefit from pet-sitting when they need it.

Responsible tourism

HomeExchange advocates a more sustainable and authentic travel model, combating mass tourism. Through its various communications, the brand encourages local, environmentally-friendly experiences, far from destinations saturated by traditional tourism.

To meet its objective of promoting an inclusive, fair and regenerative economy, HomeExchange obtained B Corp certification in September 2022, attesting to its respect for strict social and environmental standards.

== See also ==
- Home exchange – overview of the home exchange model and services in this space.
- Homestay – broader context for staying in private homes while traveling.
