= Intervac International =

- Owner: Josh Jaffe
- Products: Homestay
- Services: Home exchange
- Website: www.intervac-homeexchange.com
- Users: 30,000
- Launched: 1953; 73 years ago

Intervac International (short for International Vacation) is a service used to arrange home exchanges.

Founded in 1953 in Switzerland by several teachers that wanted to travel internationally with a limited budget during their summer vacations, Intervac was the first home exchange network.
