= Martha Young-Scholten =

American linguist

Martha Young-Scholten (born in Hanover, New Hampshire) is a linguist specialising in the phonology and syntax of second language acquisition (SLA).

== Education and career ==
Young-Scholten obtained a master's degree in linguistics at the University of Washington, Seattle. Her PhD at the same institution, which was awarded in 1991, concerned the structure of phonology in German as a second language. She has been a Professor of SLA at the School of English Literature, Language and Linguistics, Newcastle University in the United Kingdom since September 2006.

== The Minimal Trees Hypothesis ==
Young-Scholten is most notable within linguistics and SLA for developing the Minimal Trees Hypothesis with Anna Vainikka, an "important theory," where 'tree' is a metaphor of syntax for the branching structure showing how words of a phrase or sentence co-relate. The hypothesis concerns what aspects of a language learner's first language (L1) is carried over into the grammar of their second language (L2), in addition to mechanisms of universal grammar that allow new acquisition to take place.

Whereas many researchers lean towards a 'Full Transfer' view in which all the L1 grammar transfers - i.e. the initial state of the L2 is the final state of the first - Young-Scholten and Vainikka have argued that only lexical categories (e.g. the noun phrase) are drawn from the L1, and that functional categories (e.g. the inflectional phrase that represents tense) do not; rather, the learner 'grows' new ones because they start their L2 acquisition with only a 'minimal' syntactic tree.

Several competing accounts for the role of transfer and universal grammar persist in SLA; the Minimal Trees Hypothesis remains particularly controversial, and has been strongly critiqued in syntactic research on both empirical and conceptual grounds: some researchers argue that linguistic behaviour does not follow the model, and others claim that it is theoretically misconceived. For example, the idea that a component of language could be absent from the initial stage, so that the system selectively extracts only one part of the L1, is unacceptable to those who favour 'Full Transfer' rather than 'Partial Transfer'.

== Second language acquisition and formal linguistics ==
Young-Scholten's primary research focus involves the phonology of second language acquisition, particularly in German and English as L2s. Data collected from three adolescent native speakers learning German in Germany has formed the basis of several papers. The different paths of acquisition that the three speakers took - acquiring German pronunciation deviant or not at all - led Young-Scholten to argue that the nature of the linguistic input they received was crucial to their performance. For example, one learner whose exposure to German came largely through orthography (writing) did not acquire pronunciations that are unrepresented in written German, despite constantly hearing them.

Young-Scholten is also involved in formal linguistics research on exceptional language acquisition, e.g. where learning is atypical due to problems such as dyslexia or specific language impairment; the comprehension approach to foreign language instruction; and the (mainly negative) effect of orthography on the early stages of language learning.

== Published work ==
- Vainikka A, Young-Scholten M. Finding their heads: How immigrant adults posit L2 functional projections. In: Arteaga, D, ed. Festschrift for Julia Herschensohn. Amsterdam: Benjamins, 2017. In Preparation.
- Vainikka A, Young-Scholten M, Ijuin C, Jarad S. Literacy in the development of L2 English morphosyntax. In: Sosinski, M, ed. Low-educated Second Language and Literacy Acquisition: Theory, Practice and Policy. Granada: University of Granada, 2017. In Preparation.
- Young-Scholten M, Limon H. Creating new fiction for low-educated immigrant adults: Leapfrogging to Digital. The International Journal of the Book 2015, 13(4), 1–9.
- Young-Scholten M, Langer M. The role of orthographic input in L2 German: Evidence from naturalistic adult learners’ production. Applied Psycholinguistics 2015, 36(1), 93–114.
- Young-Scholten M. Who are adolescents and adults who develop literacy for the first time in an L2, and why are they of research interest?. Writing Systems Research 2015, 7(1), 1–3.
- Young-Scholten M. Great expectations in phonology? Second language acquisition research and its relation to the teaching of younger and older learners. In: Whong, M., Marsden, H., Gil, K, ed. UG and the Second Language Classroom. Springer, 2013. In Press.
- Young-Scholten Martha. Low-educated immigrants and the social relevance of second language acquisition research. Second Language Research 2013, 29(4), 441–454.
- Leung A, Young-Scholten M. Reaching out to the other side: Formal-linguistics-based SLA and Socio-SLA . Applied Linguistics Review 2013, 4(2), 259–290.
- Vainikka A, Young-Scholten M. Stage-like development and organic grammar. In: Julia Herschensohn and Martha Young-Scholten, ed. The Cambridge Handbook of Second Language Acquisition. Cambridge; New York: Cambridge University Press, 2013, pp. 581–604.
- Herschensohn J, Young-Scholten M, ed. The Cambridge Handbook of Second Language Acquisition. Cambridge; New York: Cambridge University Press, 2013.
- Vainikka A, Young-Scholten M. Universal Minimal Structure: Evidence and theoretical ramifications. Linguistic Approaches to Bilingualism 2013, 3(2), 180–212.
- Vainikka A, Young-Scholten M. The straight and narrow path. Linguistic Approaches to Bilingualism 2012, 2(3), 319–323.
- Young-Scholten M. Development in phonology: Another perspective on age. In: Dziubalska-Kołaczyk, K., Wrembel, M., Kul, M, ed. Achievements and Perspectives in SLA of Speech. Berlin: Peter Lang, 2011, pp. 331–342.
- Vainikka A, Young-Scholten M. The Acquisition of German: Introducing Organic Grammar. Berlin: De Gruyter Mouton, 2011.
- Cazzoli-Goeta M, Young-Scholten M. Yo gusto... Expanding choice or syntactic attrition?. In: Potowski, K., Rothman, J, ed. Bilingual Youth: Spanish in English-Speaking Societies. Amsterdam: John Benjamins Publishing Company, 2011, pp. 201–226.
- Cazzoli-Goeta M, Guijarro-Fuentes P, Young-Scholten M. Investigating UK Spanish variety: Implications for heritage speaker acquisition. In: Guijarro-Fuentes, P; Domínguez, L, ed. New Directions in Language Acquisition: Romance Languages in the Generative Perspective. Cambridge: Cambridge Scholars, 2010.
- Wilkinson M, Young-Scholten M. Writing to a brief: Creating fiction for immigrant adults. In: 6th Annual Conference on Low Educated Adult Second Language and Literacy Acquisition. 2010, Cologne, Germany: LOT.
- Piske T, Young-Scholten M, ed. Input Matters in SLA. Bristol: Multilingual Matters, 2009.
- Young-Scholten Martha, Strom Nancy. First-time L2 readers: Is there a critical period?. In: Kurvers, Jeanne; van der Craats, Ineke; Young-Scholten, Martha, ed. Low Educated Adult Second Language and Literacy. Utrecht: LOT, 2006, pp. 45–68.
- Young-Scholten M, Ijuin C. How can we best measure adult ESL student progress?. TESOL Adult Education Interest Section Newsletter 2006, 4(2), 1–4.
- Vainikka A, Young-Scholten M. Minimalism vs. Organic Syntax. In: Karimi, S., Simiian, V., Wilkins, W, ed. Clever and Right : Linguistic Studies in Honor of Joseph Emonds. Dordrect: Kluwer, 2006, pp.to appear.
- Unsworth S, Parodi T, Sorace A, Young-Scholten M, ed. Paths of Development in L1 and L2 Acquisition. Amsterdam; Philadelphia: John Benjamins, 2006.
- Vainikka A, Young-Scholten M. The roots of syntax and how they grow: Organic Grammar, the Basic Variety and Processability Theory. In: Unsworth, S., Parodi, T., Sorace, A., Young-Scholten, M, ed. Paths of Development in L1 and L2 Acquisition: In honor of Bonnie D. Schwartz. Amsterdam; Philadelphia: John Benjamins, 2006, pp. 77–106.
- Young-Scholten M. Is there a critical period for learning to read?. In: IATEFL Conference Selections. 2004, Liverpool, UK.
- Young-Scholten M. Prosodic constraints on allophonic distribution in adult L2 acquisition. International Journal of Bilingualism. Special Issue on the Acquisition of Second Language Phonology 2004, 8(1), 67–77.
- Vainikka A, Young-Scholten M. [Book review] Hawkins, R. 'Second Language Syntax: A Generative Introduction', Wiley-Blackwell: 2001. Lingua 2003, 113(1), 93–102.
- Archibald J, Young-Scholten M. The second language segment revisited. Second Language Research 2003, 19(3), 163–167.
- Young-Scholten M. Orthographic input in L2 phonological development. In: Burmeister, P., Piske, T., Rohde, A, ed. An Integrated View of Language Development: Papers in Honor of Henning Wode. Trier: Wissenschaftlicher Verlag Trier, 2002, pp. 263–279.
- Vainikka A, Young-Scholten M. Restructuring the CP in L2 German. In: XXVI Conference on Boston University Conference on Language Development. 2002, Boston, Massachusetts, USA: Cascadilla Press.
- Klove MH, Young-Scholten M. Repair of L2 Syllables through Metathesis. International Review of Applied Linguistics 2001, 39(2), 103-134

== See also ==
- Linguistics
- Second language acquisition
- Phonology
- Syntax
- First language
- Second language
- Comprehension approach
- Monitor Theory
