= Rebecca Louise Law =

British installation artist (born 1980)

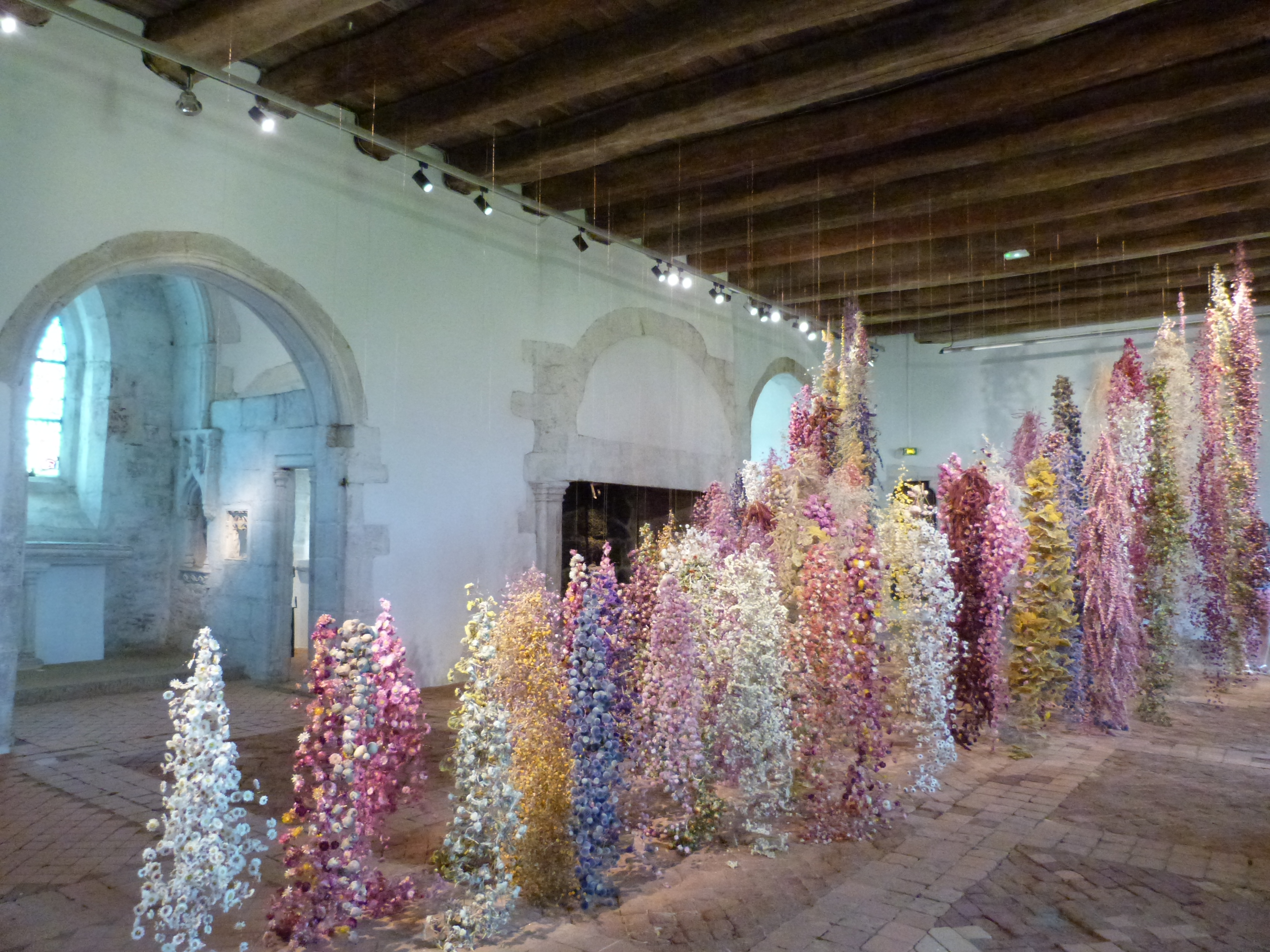
ARTE BOTANICA exhibition at the Château de la Roche-Jagu

Rebecca Louise Law (born in 1980) is a British installation artist, best known for artworks created with natural materials, namely flora.

== Life ==
She was born in 1980 and grew up in a small village in the UK. After graduating high school she trained at the Newcastle University's School of Arts and Cultures in England.

The physicality and sensuality of her work plays with the relationship between humanity and nature. Law is passionate about natural change and preservation, allowing her work to evolve as nature takes its course and offering an alternative concept of beauty. Sarasota Magazine explains Law is "known for her expansive, ethereal hanging installations" and "has collected more than 2 million dried flowers over her 20-year career."

== Exhibitions ==
Notable commissions include ‘The Grecian Garden’ (Onassis Cultural Centre, Athens), ‘The Beauty of Decay’ (Chandran Gallery, San Francisco), ‘Life in Death’ (Shirley Sherwood Gallery, London) and 'Community' (The Toledo Museum of Art). Law's work has also been exhibited by Bo. Lee Gallery, Broadway Studio & Gallery, NOW Gallery and at sites such as the Royal Academy of Arts, Chaumont-Sur-Loire and the Victoria & Albert Museum.
