= Lizeth Sloot =

Dutch biomechanist

- Education: Vrije Universiteit Amsterdam
- Known for: Mobility dysfunction, gait analysis, assistive technologies, balance analysis
- Scientific career
- Fields: Biomechanics, Motor Control, Ageing and Health
- Workplaces: Newcastle University
- Website: Newcastle University profile

Lizeth Sloot is a Dutch biomechanist and Newcastle University Academic Track (NUAcT) Fellow in Ageing and Health at the Translational and Clinical Research Institute (TCRI), based at the Campus for Ageing and Vitality in Newcastle upon Tyne. Her work focuses on motor control and balance dysfunction in older adults and populations with impaired mobility.

== Education ==
Lizeth completed her undergraduate degree in Medical Natural Sciences (Dutch: Medische Natuurwetenschappen) and her graduate degree with a specialization in Medical Physics at the Vrije Universiteit Amsterdam (VU Amsterdam). She earned her PhD in Movement Analysis in 2016 at the Vrije Universiteit Amsterdam. Her doctoral research ('Advanced technologies to assess motor dysfunction in children with cerebral palsy') contributed to the clinical applications of an interactive gait lab and the development of motorised assessment of spasticity. These parts came together in the development of a treadmill-based perturbation assessments for spasticity.

== Career ==
Following her PhD, Lizeth worked for three years as a postdoctoral researcher at the Biodesign Lab at Harvard University assessing how soft wearable robotic exosuit technology helps stroke survivors walk better and faster. She then worked for four years on the HeiAGE project at Heidelberg University, where she focused on age-related changes in movement and balance. In 2023, she joined Newcastle University as a NUAcT Fellow, holding a Rosetrees & Stoneygate Fellowship.

== Research ==
Lizeth’s research explores the biomechanics of human movement in populations affected by ageing, neurological conditions, or musculoskeletal impairments. Her work aims to develop more precise assessments of motor function and balance, to be able to develop effective individualized interventions. She currently focuses on how the foot interacts with the ground to allow us to balance ourselves during a range of movements - and how this declines when we age and fall more often.

She collaborates on interdisciplinary projects that have involved robotic exosuit technology, perturbation treadmills, robotic rollator handles and age simulation technologies. Her studies often use full-body motion capture, wearable sensors, as wel as force and muscle activity assessment. Lizeth is interested to study daily movements that are related to falls and are important for independent living, going beyond the standard straight, level walking to include movements such as standing up from a chair as well as walking and turning.

Recent topics of investigation include:

- Identifying the foot's base of support for accurate balance analysis
- The effect of rollator use on stability and coordination during sit-to-stand tasks
- Motion and balance decline with increasing age
- The role of arm movements in balance recovery after tripping
- Sharing large datasets of motion and balance decline across the lifespan

== Teaching and supervision ==
Sloot actively supervises Master’s and PhD students and mentors undergraduate researchers. Her supervisory work integrates biomechanics, rehabilitation engineering, and ageing research.

== Awards and honours ==
- Newcastle University Academic Track (NUAcT) Fellowship (2023)
- Rosetrees & Stoneygate Fellowship (2023)
- Promising Scientist Award – International Society of Biomechanics (2021)
- Elite Postdoc Program of the State of Baden-Württemberg (2021)
- Best Paper Awards – ESMAC (2014, 2020), ICRA (2018)
- HEIKA Collaborative Grant (2020)
- Ter Meulen Postdoctoral Fellowship (2016)

== Selected publications ==
1. Sloot LH, van Duijnhoven E, Brehm MA, Van Criekinge T, Millard M. The importance of the functional base-of-support for clinical biomechanical balance analysis. Gait & Posture, 2023; 106(1): S193. doi:10.1016/j.gaitpost.2023.07.233
2. van Criekinge T, Saeys W, Truijen S, Vereeck L, Sloot LH, Hallemans A. A full-body motion capture gait dataset of 138 able-bodied adults across the life span and 50 stroke survivors. Scientific data 10 (1), 852
3. Bruijn SM, Sloot LH, Kingma I, Pijnappels M. Contribution of arm movements to balance recovery after tripping in older adults. Journal of Biomechanics, 2022; 133: 110981.
4. Sloot LH et al. Effects of a soft robotic exosuit on the quality and speed of overground walking depends on walking ability after stroke. Journal of NeuroEngineering and Rehabilitation, 2023; 20(1): 113. doi:10.1186/s12984-023-01238-9
5. Flux E, van der Krogt MM, Harlaar J, Buizer AI, Sloot LH. Functional assessment of stretch hyperreflexia in children with cerebral palsy using treadmill perturbations. Journal of NeuroEngineering and Rehabilitation, 2021; 18(1): 151.
6. Gerhardy TH, Sloot LH et al. Aging in 10 Minutes: Do Age Simulation Suits Mimic Physical Decline in Old Age? Experimental Aging Research, 2024; 50(5): 692–704. doi:10.1080/0361073X.2023.2256630

== Research impact ==
Sloot’s work supports the development of tools to accurately assess motor dysfunction and balance decline, to inform the design of evidence-based interventions for fall prevention and mobility rehabilitation. Her motion capture and studies of robotic devices (exosuits and assistive devices) contribute to the development of wearable and assistive technologies that adapt to individual motor impairments.

== Affiliations ==
- Newcastle University, NUAcT and Rosetrees & Stoneygate Fellow
- Heidelberg University, Postdoctoral Researcher – Optimization, Robotics and Biomechanics group
- Harvard University, Research Fellow – Biodesign Lab (former)
- Vrije Universiteit Amsterdam, PhD student - Rehabilitation Medicine Department (former)
