= Anne Vainikka =

Finnish-American linguist (1958–2018)

Anne Vainikka (July 31, 1958, Vancouver, Washington - June 11, 2018, Newark, Delaware) was a Finnish-American linguist specialising in the syntax of Finnish and in the syntax of second language acquisition (SLA).

== Education and career ==
Vainikka received her Ph.D. in Linguistics in 1989 from the University of Massachusetts, Amherst, with a dissertation on Finnish syntax, one of the first on this topic. She continued to make contributions to the study of Finnish syntax throughout her career. A workshop in memoriam of her work in this area was held in Budapest in 2019.

At the time of Vainikka's death from cancer in 2018, she was an adjunct professor at the University of Delaware in the Department of Linguistics and Cognitive Science.

An online archive of her works and work inspired by her research has been established in her memory at the University of Massachusetts, Amherst.

== Contributions to the theory of SLA ==
Vainikka was most notable within linguistics and SLA for developing the Minimal Trees Hypothesis with Martha Young-Scholten, an "important theory," where 'tree' is a metaphor of syntax for the branching structure showing how words of a phrase or sentence co-relate. The hypothesis concerns what aspects of a language learner's first language (L1) is carried over into the grammar of their second language (L2), in addition to mechanisms of universal grammar that allow new acquisition to take place.

Whereas many researchers lean towards a 'Full Transfer' view in which all the L1 grammar transfers - i.e. the initial state of the L2 is the final state of the first - Young-Scholten and Vainikka argued that only lexical categories (e.g. the noun phrase) are drawn from the L1, and that functional categories (e.g. the inflectional phrase that represents tense) do not; rather, the learner 'grows' new ones because they start their L2 acquisition with only a 'minimal' syntactic tree.

Several competing accounts for the role of transfer and universal grammar persist in SLA; the Minimal Trees Hypothesis remains particularly controversial, and has been strongly critiqued in syntactic research on both empirical and conceptual grounds: some researchers argue that linguistic behaviour does not follow the model, and others claim that it is theoretically misconceived. For example, the idea that a component of language could be absent from the initial stage, so that the system selectively extracts only one part of the L1, is unacceptable to those who favour 'Full Transfer' rather than 'Partial Transfer'.

== See also ==
- Linguistics
- Second language acquisition
- Syntax

== Bibliography ==
- Schwartz BD (1998) 'On two hypotheses of ʺtransferʺ in L2A: minimal trees and absolute L1 influence. In Flynn S, Martohardojono G & O'Neil W (eds) The Generative Study of Second Language Acquisition. pp. 35–59. Mahwah, NJ: Erlbaum.
- Schwartz BD & Sprouse RA (1994) 'Word order and nominative case in nonnative language acquisition: a longitudinal study of (L1 Turkish) German interlanguage.' In Hoekstra T & Schwartz BD (eds) Language Acquisition Studies in Generative Grammar: Papers in Honor of Kenneth Wexler from the 1991 GLOW Workshops. pp. 317–368. Amsterdam: Benjamins.
- Schwartz BD & Sprouse RA (1996) 'L2 cognitive states and the full transfer/full access model.' Second Language Research 12: 40-72.
- Unsworth S, Parodi T, Sorace A & Young-Scholten M (eds) (2005) Paths of Development in L1 and L2 Acquisition. Amsterdam: Benjamins.
- Vainikka A & Young-Scholten M (1994) 'Direct access to X'-theory: evidence from Korean and Turkish adults learning German.' In Hoekstra T & Schwartz BD (eds) Language Acquisition Studies in Generative Grammar: Papers in Honor of Kenneth Wexler from the 1991 GLOW Workshops. Amsterdam: John Benjamins.
- Vainikka A & Young-Scholten M (1996) 'Gradual development of L2 phrase structure.' Second Language Research 12: 7-39.
- Vainikka A & Young-Scholten M (1998) 'Functional categories and related mechanisms in child second language acquisition.' In Flynn S, Martohardojono G & O'Neil W (eds) The Generative Study of Second Language Acquisition.
- Vainikka A & Young-Scholten M (2003) 'Review of Roger Hawkins (2001): Second Language Syntax: a Generative Introduction.' Lingua.
- White L (1991) 'Adverb placement in second language acquisition: some effects of positive and negative evidence in the classroom.' Second Language Research 7: 133-161.
- White L (2003) Second Language Acquisition and Universal Grammar. Cambridge: Cambridge University Press.
