= Hermann Moisl =

Hermann Moisl is a retired academic. He was a senior lecturer and visiting fellow in linguistics at Newcastle University.

== Education ==
He received his BA from McGill University, his MPhil from Trinity College Dublin, his DPhil from University of Oxford, and his MSc from Newcastle University.

== Career ==
Moisl's research interests include computational linguistics, natural language processing and text processing, corpus linguistics, the cultural role of literacy and Celtic languages and history. He has conducted multivariate analysis of text corpora. He was a key investigator of the Newcastle Electronic Corpus of Tyneside English Project alongside his colleague Karen Corrigan.
