= Mutual exchange =

The term mutual exchange describes the ability of two (or more) tenants in the public housing sector to move house by swapping their homes. Mutual exchange is possible in some countries, such as the UK and Sweden. Other terms used for this are "home swap" or "homeswap".

== Mutual exchange process ==
To move home, both tenants must have permission of their landlords. Landlords will normally only grant an exchange if a number of criteria are met. These include:

- Neither tenant owes rent
- Neither tenant is moving to a home that the landlord thinks is too big or small for their circumstances
- Both tenants are secure tenants (council tenants) or assured tenants (housing association)
- Neither tenant is in the process of being evicted
- In Sweden, both tenants must have valid reasons for the exchange, such as needing a larger home to accommodate a new-born child. Also, in order to curb the black market for rental homes, it is not allowed to request payment from the other tenant.

A mutual exchange may involve more than two tenants. The largest reported swap in England has involved a group of 6 tenants swapping their homes between them.

Precise details of the criteria used for home exchanges can be found by a tenant from a their landlord, and some will identify free resources, such as websites, to help their tenants pair up to make a swap. (e.g.).
