= Annabel Dover =

British painter

- Born: Liverpool, England
- Education: Newcastle University; Central Saint Martins, London; Cambridge University
- Occupation: Artist
- Website: annabeldover.uk

Annabel Dover (born 1975 in Liverpool) is a British artist. She has a BA (Hons) in fine art from Newcastle University (1998), an MA in fine art from Central Saint Martins, London (2002), and a teaching qualification (PGCE) in art and design from the University of Cambridge (2003).

Dover uses a variety of media including painting, photography, video, drawing and cyanotype. Her approach is to explore social relationships that are mediated through objects. The Imperial War Museum acquired a set of Dover's cyanotypes which also appear in Blue Mythologies: Reflections on a Colour by Carol Mavor.

== Literary Work ==
Dover's debut novel Florilegia was published in 2022 by Cool Moist Books. It is a work of literary fiction exploring themes of memory, nature and the artistic process.

== Critical reception ==
"Haunting, enchanting, and forensically observed... a tender, anthropological elegy, and it will stay with you long after you finish it." – Sophie Dahl

"A staggering accomplishment. Impossible to categorise, this is a work of exquisite art; encyclopaedic in its scope, drawing connections across time and cultures. An alchemist, Annabel Dover transmutes the minutiae of life into poetry." – Heidi James

"Annabel Dover's writing is a delight: inquisitive, keen-eyed, alive with colour and texture; she has the rare ability to make details sing. I loved this book." – Laura Barton

"You'll never read another book like this... it defies any description save that it is mad, enchanting and mesmerising.... At its end I had no idea what I had been reading but I know it's a work of art." – Polly Devlin

"A fascinating, subversive and moving tribute to forgotten women by a unique artist." – Rhiannon Lucy Cosslett

"A trippy, hyper-connected, vastly entertaining memoir entangled with the history of art, botany and science. It's hypnotising." – Jennifer Higgie

"Binding and entwining ... exceptional and enjoyable ... minds set racing by the everyday strangeness of the experiences, imaginings and perceptions we have encountered in this extraordinary book." – Declan O'Driscoll

"Dover’s bouquet is illustrated with reproductions of cyanotypes, and her text brings together a sense of printing with flowers, explorations of backstreets, esoteric traditions, curatorial oddities, and quiddities. This is a tough book to describe though. Dover takes no prisoners." – Anthony Howell

== Selected collections ==
- Priseman Seabrook Collection, UK
- The Imperial War Museum

== Selected exhibitions ==
- 2006 – Trace and Nostalgia, Persimmon Gallery, Los Angeles, USA
- 2010 – Streaming Film Festival, The Hague, Netherlands
- 2010 – Whistlejacket, CoExist, Southend, England
- 2014 – Unstable Ground, Paper, Manchester, England
- 2014 – News from Nowhere, Kelmscott House, National Trust, London
- 2014 – Artist in Residence, Aldeburgh International Poetry Festival, England
