= Hsing Chia-hui =

Taiwanese children's author (1973–2019)

- Native name: 幸佳慧
- Born: August 15, 1973 Tainan, Taiwan
- Died: October 16, 2019 (aged 46) Tainan, Taiwan
- Occupation: Writer
- Citizenship: Republic of China
- Education: National Cheng Kung University (BA); University of Surrey (MA); Newcastle University (PhD)

Hsing Chia-hui (Chinese: 幸佳慧; August 15, 1973 – October 16, 2019), also known as Arlene Hsing, was a Taiwanese children's book author.

== Biography ==
Hsing was born in Tainan in 1973. She graduated from National Cheng Kung University's Department of Chinese Language and earned a master's degree in children's literature from the University of Surrey, with a thesis titled Ambiguity in Postmodern Metafictive Picturebooks. She earned a doctorate degree in children's literature from Newcastle University. Her dissertation was titled Gained in Translation: The Effects of Translators' Gender on English-language Children's Literature as Translated in China and Taiwan.

Hsing worked as a reporter for Minsheng Daily and as an editor at a publishing house. She established the Hulu Alley Reading Association in Tainan, to promote reading, and ran the children's reading room at the main branch of the Tainan Public Library.

Hsing was recognized for her contributions to Taiwanese children's literature, including writing, researching, and translating works. In 2019, she was awarded a Special Contributions Award at the Ministry of Culture's Golden Tripod Awards, Taiwan's highest publishing industry honour. The jury noted that her works often addressed issues not typically found in Taiwanese children's literature, such as her last book, 蝴蝶朵朵 (Duoduo the Butterfly), which examined childhood sexual abuse.

In late 2018, Hsing was diagnosed with ampullary cancer. She died on October 16, 2019, at the age of 46.

== Selected works ==
- 家有125 (The Family Has 125), 2007 ISBN 9789864179176
- 希望小提琴 (Violin of Hope), 2012 ISBN 9789862169438
- 大鬼小鬼图书馆 (Big Ghost Little Ghost Library), 2016 ISBN 9787564527785
- 亲爱的 (My Dear), 2018 ISBN 9789862164204
- 蝴蝶朵朵 (Duoduo the Butterfly), 2019 ISBN 9789578423763
