= Anna Jones (businesswoman) =

British business woman and entrepreneur (born 1975)

- Born: Anna Kristina Jones; March 1975 (age 51)
- Education: Newcastle University
- Occupation: Businesswoman
- Title: co-founder and director, AllBright

Anna Jones (born March 1975) is a British entrepreneur. She is the co-founder of AllBright, a community that connects women at work. She was CEO of Hearst Magazines, UK between 2014 and 2017.

Jones was a member of the board of directors for the Creative Industries Federation. She was on the board of Telecom Italia as chairman of the Nomination and Remuneration Committee.

== Early life and early career ==
Jones, whose mother is Danish, grew up in rural Yorkshire. She studied international business management at the University of Newcastle with a year at the École Supérieur de Commerce in Provence, France as part of her studies. Her first job was in public relations, followed by a marketing post in the video games industry.

== EMAP, Hachette Filipacchi, and Hearst ==
In 2000 Jones was hired by EMAP to work in its marketing department. At EMAP, she oversaw the marketing for the launch of Grazia, the UK's first weekly glossy magazine.

In 2005 she was appointed as Digital and Marketing Director at Hachette Filipacchi, the Lagardère-owned publishing company, where she worked on media brands such as Elle, Red and Digital Spy. In 2010 she became Hachette's Digital and Strategy Director. In 2011 Hachette merged with the Hearst-owned National Magazine Company to create Hearst Magazines, UK. Following the merger, Jones was appointed chief operating officer (COO) of Hearst Magazines, whose titles include Cosmopolitan, Elle, Country Living, Esquire and Harper's Bazaar and a digital portfolio that includes websites such as Digital Spy and Net Doctor.

In 2014, following the departure of Arnaud de Puyfontaine, Jones was appointed CEO of Hearst. As CEO, she oversaw the launch Hearst Live, a new events-focused division, and Hearst Made, which provides editorial content for companies such as Procter & Gamble, Asda, and Jamie Oliver Magazine.

== Empowering Women and AllBright ==
As Hearst CEO, Jones also launched Hearst Empowering Women, 'a major new editorial brand aimed at celebrating the lives, aspirations and achievements of British women'. Partnering with Theirworld, Sarah Brown's charity for women and children, the brand established a digital hub and hosted live events.

Jones stepped down as CEO of Hearst in 2017 to establish AllBright, an education and networking organisation that provides a platform, skills and connections to working women across the UK. AllBright comprises Members’ clubs, an Academy and Live Events to celebrate and connect working women and was co-founded with Debbie Wosskow, entrepreneur and former Founder/CEO of Love Home Swap.

== Sharestyle ==
In 2016 Jones and Wosskow also founded Sharestyle, a digital marketplace that aggregates style and lifestyle experts and connects them with users seeking expert assistance. Its mobile app, which brings the principles of the sharing economy to the style market, was launched in the UK in February 2017 and will launch in the U.S. later in the year. Jones is currently executive chair of Sharestyle.

== Creative Industries Federation ==
Jones currently sits on the board of the Creative Industries Federation, an independent representative body for arts and creative industries. Fellow board members include Tony Hall, Baron Hall of Birkenhead, the Director General of the BBC, John Sorrell (designer), and Jude Kelly, the Artistic Director of the Southbank Centre.

== Accolades ==
In 2014 Jones was featured in Women Fashion Power, Zaha Hadid's exhibition at London's Design Museum. In 2015 she was listed as one of the Evening Standard’s 1000 most influential Londoners and the following year she was shortlisted for 'Pioneer of the Year' at the British Media Awards. She also won a Women in Marketing Award in 2016 for her efforts to champion female empowerment.
