= Adrian Martineau =

English professor

Adrian R. Martineau FRSB is professor of respiratory infection and immunity at The London School of Medicine and Dentistry, Queen Mary University of London. He is a specialist in the effects of vitamin D on health and the treatment of tuberculosis.

He completed his B.Med. Sci degree in Epidemiology and Public Health at Newcastle University in 1995, and graduated from Newcastle University Medical School in 1996. He was awarded a Diploma in Tropical Medicine and Hygiene from University of Liverpool. After working as a physician in a rural hospital in South Africa, he returned to Liverpool to continue medical training in 1999, and became a member of the Royal College of Physicians in 2001. He earned a PhD in 2010 and became Fellow of the Royal Society of Biology in 2017.

He leads the COVIDENCE UK study and the CORONAVIT trial.
