= Richard J. Dawson =

British civil engineer and academic

Richard Dawson
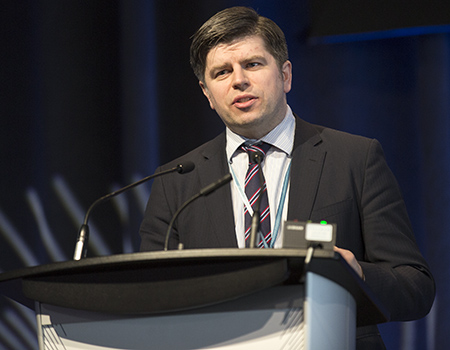
- Dawson at the IPCC Cities and Climate Change Science Conference, 2018
- Born: Richard J. Dawson
- Known for: Infrastructure resilience; Flood and coastal risk management; Water security; Adaptation to climate change
- Awards: Fellow of the Royal Academy of Engineering (2023); Queen’s Anniversary Prize (2024)

Academic background
- Education: University of Bristol
- Thesis: Performance based management of flood defence systems (2003)

Academic work
- Institutions: Newcastle University

Richard J. Dawson is a British civil engineer and academic who is Professor of Earth Systems Engineering at Newcastle University. His work focuses on climate risk, infrastructure resilience, and water security.

== Education ==
Dawson holds a Master of Engineering (MEng) degree in Civil Engineering with study in France and a PhD from the University of Bristol, completed in 2003.

== Career ==
Dawson began his academic career as a Research Associate at the University of Bristol from 2002 to 2004. He subsequently joined Newcastle University, where he was a Research Associate from 2004 to 2006 and a Senior Research Associate from 2006 to 2010. He was appointed Reader in Earth Systems Engineering in 2011 and became Professor in 2012. In 2010, he was a visiting researcher at Arizona State University.

From 2017 to 2020, Dawson served as Group Head for Water within the School of Engineering at Newcastle University, and in 2020, he was appointed Director of Research and Innovation for the School. He also served as Associate Director of the Tyndall Centre for Climate Change Research from 2015 to 2025.

In 2025, Dawson was appointed to the Science and Technology Advisory Council of the UK Government’s Department for Energy Security and Net Zero (DESNZ).

== Research ==
Dawson's research focuses on the assessment and management of climate-related risks to urban areas, infrastructure, and the built environment. His work combines engineering and environmental systems modelling and is often conducted in collaboration with policymakers and international organisations.

He served as Director of the UKRI GCRF Water Security Hub, an £18 million initiative that applied a systems-based approach to address global water security challenges. His contributions include national-scale flood risk assessments in the United Kingdom, the development of models for infrastructure resilience analysis, and frameworks for evaluating water security in international catchments.

Dawson has worked on the integration of climate change adaptation and mitigation strategies at the urban scale. He led the EPSRC-funded iBUILD programme, which developed methodologies for valuing infrastructure resilience and informed UK government guidance.

From 2019 to 2025, Dawson was a member of the Adaptation Committee of the UK's Climate Change Committee. He also acted as a technical expert to the National Infrastructure Commission between 2016 and 2023.

Dawson contributed to the IPCC Sixth Assessment Report as a lead author for Chapter 6 on Cities, Settlements and Key Infrastructure, and as coordinating lead author for the Cross-Chapter Paper on Cities and Settlements by the Sea.

== Awards and honours ==
- Queen’s Anniversary Prize in Higher and Further Education for water security research (2024)
- Fellow of the Royal Academy of Engineering (2023)
- Lloyd’s of London Science of Risk Prize (2012)
- EPSRC Fellowship (2010–2015)
- Fellow of the Institution of Civil Engineers (FICE) and a Chartered Engineer (CEng)

== Selected publications ==
- Butters, Olivia; Robson, Craig; McClean, Fergus; Glenis, Vassilis; Virgo, James; Ford, Alistair; Iliadis, Christos; Dawson, Richard (2025). "An open framework for analysing future flood risk in urban areas". Environmental Modelling & Software. 185 106302. Bibcode:2025EnvMS.18506302B. doi:10.1016/j.envsoft.2024.106302.
- Polaine, Xanthe K.; Dawson, Richard; Walsh, Claire L.; Amezaga, Jaime; Peña-Varón, Miguel; Lee, Cindy; Rao, Sandhya (2022). "Systems thinking for water security". Civil Engineering and Environmental Systems. 39 (3): 205–223. Bibcode:2022CEES...39..205P. doi:10.1080/10286608.2022.2108806.
- Wolf, Kristina; Dawson, Richard J.; Mills, Jon P.; Blythe, Phil; Morley, Jeremy (2022). "Towards a digital twin for supporting multi-agency incident management in a smart city". Scientific Reports. 12 (1) 16221. Bibcode:2022NatSR..1216221W. doi:10.1038/s41598-022-20178-8. PMC 9519921. PMID 36171329.
- Ming, Xiaodong; Liang, Qiuhua; Dawson, Richard; Xia, Xilin; Hou, Jingming (2022). "A quantitative multi-hazard risk assessment framework for compound flooding considering hazard inter-dependencies and interactions". Journal of Hydrology. 607 127477. Bibcode:2022JHyd..60727477M. doi:10.1016/j.jhydrol.2022.127477.
- Haasnoot, Marjolijn; Winter, Gundula; Brown, Sally; Dawson, Richard J.; Ward, Philip J.; Eilander, Dirk (2021). "Long-term sea-level rise necessitates a commitment to adaptation: A first order assessment". Climate Risk Management. 34 100355. Bibcode:2021CliRM..3400355H. doi:10.1016/j.crm.2021.100355. hdl:1871.1/0c659e6a-74c7-4a4e-acb8-9e41f368b073.
- McClean, Fergus; Dawson, Richard; Kilsby, Chris (2020). "Implications of Using Global Digital Elevation Models for Flood Risk Analysis in Cities". Water Resources Research. 56 (10) e2020WR028241. Bibcode:2020WRR....5628241M. doi:10.1029/2020WR028241.
- Caparros-Midwood, Daniel; Dawson, Richard; Barr, Stuart (2019). "Low Carbon, Low Risk, Low Density: Resolving choices about sustainable development in cities". Cities. 89: 252–267. doi:10.1016/j.cities.2019.02.018.
- Reckien, Diana; Salvia, Monica; Heidrich, Oliver; Church, Jon Marco; Pietrapertosa, Filomena; De Gregorio-Hurtado, Sonia; d'Alonzo, Valentina; Foley, Aoife; Simoes, Sofia G.; Krkoška Lorencová, Eliška; Orru, Hans; Orru, Kati; Wejs, Anja; Flacke, Johannes; Olazabal, Marta; Geneletti, Davide; Feliu, Efrén; Vasilie, Sergiu; Nador, Cristiana; Krook-Riekkola, Anna; Matosović, Marko; Fokaides, Paris A.; Ioannou, Byron I.; Flamos, Alexandros; Spyridaki, Niki-Artemis; Balzan, Mario V.; Fülöp, Orsolya; Paspaldzhiev, Ivan; Grafakos, Stelios; Dawson, Richard (2018). "How are cities planning to respond to climate change? Assessment of local climate plans from 885 cities in the EU-28". Journal of Cleaner Production. 191: 207–219. Bibcode:2018JCPro.191..207R. doi:10.1016/j.jclepro.2018.03.220. hdl:10810/44138.
- Bai, Xuemei; Dawson, Richard J.; Ürge-Vorsatz, Diana; Delgado, Gian C.; Salisu Barau, Aliyu; Dhakal, Shobhakar; Dodman, David; Leonardsen, Lykke; Masson-Delmotte, Valérie; Roberts, Debra C.; Schultz, Seth (2018). "Six research priorities for cities and climate change". Nature. 555 (7694): 23–25. Bibcode:2018Natur.555...23B. doi:10.1038/d41586-018-02409-z.
- Ürge-Vorsatz, Diana; Rosenzweig, Cynthia; Dawson, Richard J.; Sanchez Rodriguez, Roberto; Bai, Xuemei; Barau, Aliyu Salisu; Seto, Karen C.; Dhakal, Shobhakar (2018). "Locking in positive climate responses in cities". Nature Climate Change. 8 (3): 174–177. Bibcode:2018NatCC...8..174U. doi:10.1038/s41558-018-0100-6.
- Guerreiro, Selma B.; Dawson, Richard J.; Kilsby, Chris; Lewis, Elizabeth; Ford, Alistair (2018). "Future heat-waves, droughts and floods in 571 European cities". Environmental Research Letters. 13 (3): 034009. Bibcode:2018ERL....13c4009G. doi:10.1088/1748-9326/aaaad3.
- Pregnolato, Maria; Ford, Alistair; Glenis, Vassilis; Wilkinson, Sean; Dawson, Richard (2017). "Impact of Climate Change on Disruption to Urban Transport Networks from Pluvial Flooding". Journal of Infrastructure Systems. 23 (4) 04017015. doi:10.1061/(ASCE)IS.1943-555X.0000372.
- Panteli, Mathaios; Pickering, Cassandra; Wilkinson, Sean; Dawson, Richard; Mancarella, Pierluigi (2017). "Power System Resilience to Extreme Weather: Fragility Modeling, Probabilistic Impact Assessment, and Adaptation Measures". IEEE Transactions on Power Systems. 32 (5): 3747–3757. Bibcode:2017ITPSy..32.3747P. doi:10.1109/TPWRS.2016.2641463.
- Fu, Gaihua; Wilkinson, Sean; Dawson, Richard J. (2016). "A Spatial Network Model for Civil Infrastructure System Development". Computer-Aided Civil and Infrastructure Engineering. 31 (9): 661–680. doi:10.1111/mice.12204.
- Dawson, Richard (2015). "Handling Interdependencies in Climate Change Risk Assessment". Climate. 3 (4): 1079–1096. Bibcode:2015Clim....3.1079D. doi:10.3390/cli3041079.
- Khoury, Mehdi; Bullock, Seth; Fu, Gaihua; Dawson, Richard (2015). "Improving measures of topological robustness in networks of networks and suggestion of a novel way to counter both failure propagation and isolation". Infrastructure Complexity. 2 1. doi:10.1186/s40551-015-0004-9. hdl:1983/5b8e2bc3-b2cc-4734-9cb0-99413a5bc7b9.
- Dawson, Richard J.; Peppe, Roger; Wang, Miao (2011). "An agent-based model for risk-based flood incident management". Natural Hazards. 59 (1): 167–189. Bibcode:2011NatHa..59..167D. doi:10.1007/s11069-011-9745-4.
- Dawson, R. J.; Dickson, M. E.; Nicholls, R. J.; Hall, J. W.; Walkden, M. J. A.; Stansby, P. K.; Mokrech, M.; Richards, J.; Zhou, J.; Milligan, J.; Jordan, A.; Pearson, S.; Rees, J.; Bates, P. D.; Koukoulas, S.; Watkinson, A. R. (2009). "Integrated analysis of risks of coastal flooding and cliff erosion under scenarios of long term change". Climatic Change. 95 (1–2): 249–288. Bibcode:2009ClCh...95..249D. doi:10.1007/s10584-008-9532-8.
- Hall, Jim W.; Sayers, Paul B.; Dawson, Richard J. (2005). "National-scale Assessment of Current and Future Flood Risk in England and Wales". Natural Hazards. 36 (1–2): 147–164. Bibcode:2005NatHa..36..147H. doi:10.1007/s11069-004-4546-7.
- Hall, J. W.; Dawson, R. J.; Sayers, P. B.; Rosu, C.; Chatterton, J. B.; Deakin, R. (2003). "A methodology for national-scale flood risk assessment". Proceedings of the Institution of Civil Engineers - Water and Maritime Engineering. 156 (3): 235–247. Bibcode:2003ICEW..156..235H. doi:10.1680/wame.2003.156.3.235.
