= Tom Dening =

Dementia research professor (born 1956)

Tom Dening (born August 1956) is professor of dementia research at the University of Nottingham. Dening qualified in Medicine at Newcastle University in 1980. He is the co-author of the Oxford Textbook of Old Age Psychiatry, a standard textbook in that area.

== Selected publications ==
- Clinical Guidelines in Old Age Psychiatry. 2001. (With Alistair Burns and Brian Lawlor)
- Mental Health and Care Homes. 2011. (With Alisoun Milne)
- Oxford Textbook of Old Age Psychiatry. Oxford University Press, Oxford, 2013. (Oxford Textbooks in Psychiatry) (With Alan Thomas)
