= Miodrag Stojković =

Serbian geneticist

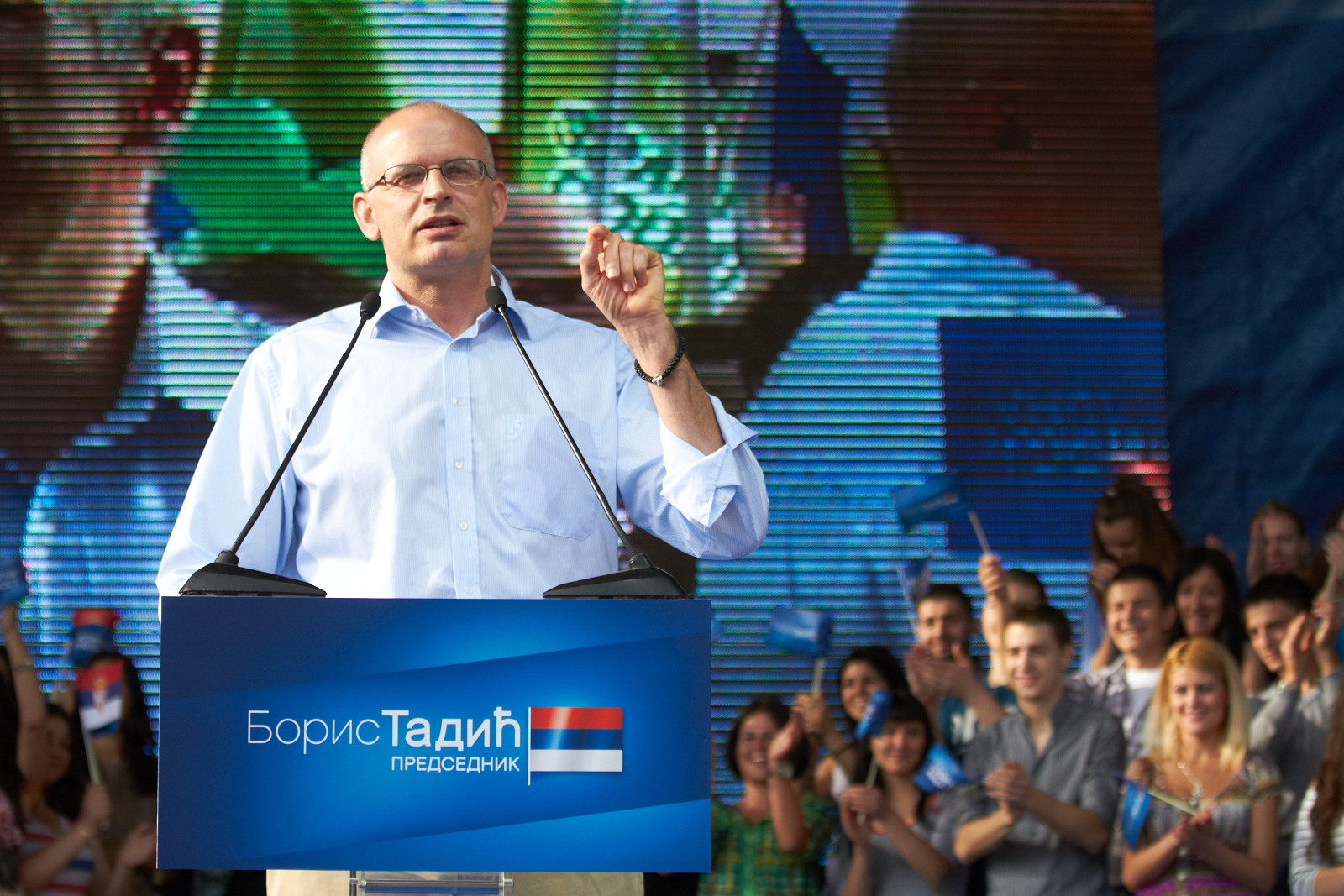
- Born: Миодраг Стојковић; 5 July 1964 (age 62); Leskovac, SFR Yugoslavia (now Serbia)
- Education: University of Belgrade, LMU Munich (PhD)
- Known for: Proposing use of stem cells to combat various diseases
- Awards
- Scientific career
- Fields: Genetics
- Institutions: Newcastle University, UK; Centro de Investigación Príncipe Felipe, Valencia, Spain

Miodrag Stojković (Serbian: Миодраг Стојковић; born 5 July 1964) is a Serbian researcher in genetics with the Institute of Human Genetics at Newcastle University. He holds a PhD from the Ludwig-Maximilians-Universität München (LMU) in Munich. As of January 2006, he is serving as a deputy director and head of Cellular Reprogramming Laboratory, Centro de Investigación Príncipe Felipe, Valencia, Spain.

According to TIME magazine, Stojković has attempted to create human embryos by injecting a patient's own DNA into an ovum with the genetic material removed. He hopes to harvest stem cells—which can develop into almost any organ—and coax them to produce insulin in diabetics. This research could lead to a cure for Alzheimer's, Parkinson's and heart disease.

On the German TV show "Menschen bei Maischberger" (June 2006), he claimed that stem cell therapy would allow paraplegic patients to walk in three years.

== Biography ==
Stojković earned his Veterinary Medicine Degree from the University of Belgrade, then in Yugoslavia, in 1990. He then moved to Munich for several years, where he gained his Veterinary Medicine Equivalency from LMU, worked there as a Post-Doctoral Fellow responsible for in vitro production of bovine embryos and later served as head of the IVF Laboratory for LMU's Dept. of Molecular Animal Breeding & Biotechnology. In January 2001, he co-founded the European College for Animal Reproduction (ECAR) and served as a scientific adviser to Therapeutic Human Polyclonals in Tucson, USA and Agrobiogen GmbH in Laretzhausen, Germany. He returned to Munich and LMU the following year, where he headed the UVF Laboratory and served as senior research embryonologist and senior research associate. In 2003, he moved to England and Newcastle University as a university reader in embryology and stem cell biology at the medical school's Institute of Human Genetics. In August 2004, he was granted the first licence to use nuclear transfer embryos to derive human embryonic stem cells in Europe, and in the following month, he became the deputy director of the Centre for Stem Cell Biology and Developmental Genetics at the University of Newcastle. In 2005, he served as a visiting professor to the University of Kragujevac in Serbia and Montenegro. Later in the year, he became chair in embryology and stem cell biology at the University of Newcastle, and in 2006, deputy director and head of the Cellular Reprogramming Laboratory at the Centro de Investigación Príncipe Felipe in Valencia, Spain.

== Awards ==
- Academia Europaea
