= Nicola Curtin =

British oncologist

- Born: 1954 (age 71–72)
- Education: University of York, University of Manchester, University of Surrey
- Scientific career
- Workplaces: Newcastle University

Nicola Curtin is an English cancer researcher and academic. She is Professor of Experimental Cancer Therapeutics at Newcastle University. She is best known for being part of the Newcastle University team that developed Rubraca, a PARP inhibitor used as an anti-cancer agent addressing BRCA mutation, and for donating her share of the royalties to charity.

== Education ==
Curtin received her undergraduate degree in biology from the University of York in 1975. She studied liver carcinogenesis and received her MSc from the University of Manchester in 1977 followed by her PhD from the University of Surrey in 1981.

== Research ==
Curtin is a team leader at the Northern Institute for Cancer Research at Newcastle University. She has been teaching and doing research at the university since 1982. Curtin's research is currently focused on DNA-damage response and has received 15 patents as of 2019. She was one of the researchers behind the development of Rubraca, which has been approved for use by the National Health Service in cases of ovarian cancer. Newcastle University sold the royalties for Rubraca for $31 million.

Curtin's academic publications have been cited over 17,000 times, resulting in an h-index of 64 and an i10-index of 156.

She was elected a Fellow of the Academy of Medical Sciences in 2022.

== Curtin PARP Fund at the Community Foundation Tyne & Wear and Northumberland ==
Curtin used the royalties she received from Rubraca (around £865,000) to establish the Curtin PARP (Passionate About Realising your Potential) Fund at the Community Foundation in Tyne & Wear and Northumberland, which is a non-profit organization that matches funds to different community causes. It is aimed at helping disadvantaged people gain access to education and employment opportunities. Curtin was inspired to create this fund by the realization that despite the years of hard work, the monetary success was largely due to luck.

== Selected publications ==
- Bryant, Helen E.; Schultz, Niklas; Thomas, Huw D.; Parker, Kayan M.; Flower, Dan; Lopez, Elena; Kyle, Suzanne; Meuth, Mark; Curtin, Nicola J.; Helleday, Thomas (April 2005). "Specific killing of BRCA2-deficient tumours with inhibitors of poly(ADP-ribose) polymerase". Nature. 434 (7035): 913–917. Bibcode:2005Natur.434..913B. doi:10.1038/nature03443. PMID 15829966. S2CID 4391043.
- Hickson, Ian; Zhao, Yan; Richardson, Caroline J.; Green, Sharon J.; Martin, Niall M. B.; Orr, Alisdair I.; Reaper, Philip M.; Jackson, Stephen P.; Curtin, Nicola J.; Smith, Graeme C. M. (15 December 2004). "Identification and Characterization of a Novel and Specific Inhibitor of the Ataxia-Telangiectasia Mutated Kinase ATM". Cancer Research. 64 (24): 9152–9159. doi:10.1158/0008-5472.CAN-04-2727. PMID 15604286.
- Curtin, Nicola J. (23 November 2012). "DNA repair dysregulation from cancer driver to therapeutic target". Nature Reviews Cancer. 12 (12): 801–817. doi:10.1038/nrc3399. PMID 23175119. S2CID 21626957.
- Calabrese, C. R.; Almassy, R.; Barton, S.; Batey, M. A.; Calvert, A. H.; Canan-Koch, S.; Durkacz, B. W.; Hostomsky, Z.; Kumpf, R. A.; Kyle, S.; Li, J.; Maegley, K.; Newell, D. R.; Notarianni, E.; Stratford, I. J.; Skalitzky, D.; Thomas, H. D.; Wang, L.-Z.; Webber, S. E.; Williams, K. J.; Curtin, N. J. (6 January 2004). "Anticancer Chemosensitization and Radiosensitization by the Novel Poly(ADP-ribose) Polymerase-1 Inhibitor AG14361". JNCI Journal of the National Cancer Institute. 96 (1): 56–67. doi:10.1093/jnci/djh005. PMID 14709739.
