= Stephen Graham (academic) =

Stephen Graham FBA is a British scholar of cities and urban life. Since 2010, he has been Professor of Cities and Society at Newcastle University's School of Architecture, Planning and Landscape. A qualified urban planner, he has an interdisciplinary background in human geography, urbanism and the sociology of technology. A widely cited author in contemporary urban studies and related fields, Graham’s work explores how cities and urban life are being reshaped by increased movement and mobility, intensifying social inequalities, the widespread application of digital technology, and the widening insecurities that characterise urban life. His most recent work has sought to rethink cities and urban life in fully three-dimensional ways that help to understand their increased vertical reach (both far above and far below ground level).

== Education and career ==
Graham graduated from Southampton University in 1986 with a Geography BSc. Between 1987 and 1989 he completed an M.Phil. in Urban Planning at Newcastle University. Moving into the professional world of urban policy and planning, he worked in spatial planning and local economic policy at Sheffield City Council between 1989 and 1992. Graham’s career as an academic began in 1992 when we took up a lectureship in urban planning at Newcastle University. His PhD, completed part-time in Science and Technology Studies at Manchester University, was awarded in 1995 and was titled Networking Cities: A Comparison of Urban Telecommunications Policies in the U.K. and France. Graham was appointed Professor of Urban Technology at Newcastle University in 2001. Between 2005 and 2010 he was Professor of Human Geography at the University of Durham, before returning to Newcastle University.

Graham was a Visiting Professor in MIT’s Department of Urban Studies and Planning between 1999 and 2000. He has also held visiting positions of the University of British Columbia, Goldsmiths College and New York University. In 2021 he is International Visiting Scholar at the Havens Wright Center for Social Justice at the University of Wisconsin-Madison.

== Honours ==
In 2014 Graham was included in the International Bibliographical Centre’s list of 2000 Outstanding Intellectuals of the 21st Century. In 2019, Graham was elected Fellow of the British Academy. That same year he was awarded as honorary Ph.D. by Aalborg University for “distinguished efforts in the field of urban studies.”

== Books ==
- (Co-Edited with Patsy Healey, Simin Davoudi, Ali Madani-Pour and Stuart Cameron) Managing Cities: The New Urban Context (John Wiley and Sons, Oxford, 1995).
- (Co-authored with Simon Marvin) Telecommunications and the City: Electronic Spaces, Urban Places (Routledge, London, 1996)
- (Co-authored with Simon Marvin) La Città e le Telecomunicazioni, (Baskerville, Milan, 1997).
- (Co-authored with Simon Marvin) Splintering Urbanism: Networked Infrastructure, Technological Mobilities and the Urban Condition (Routledge, London, 2001).
- The Cybercities Reader (Routledge, London, 2004).
- Cities, War and Terrorism: Towards an Urban Geopolitics (Blackwell, Oxford, 2004).
- Disrupted Cities: When Infrastructure Fails (Routledge, New York, 2010).
- Cities Under Siege: The New Military Urbanism (Verso, London, 2010).
- Cidades Sitiadas: O Novo Urbanismo Militar (Boitempo, Sao Paulo, 2011).
- Villes Sous Contrôle: La Militarisation de L'Espace Urbain (Editions La Découverte, Paris, 2011).
- Belägrade Städer: Den Nya Militära Urbanismen (Daidalos, Gothenburg, 2011).
- Kuşatılan Şehirler (Nota Bene, Ankara,2011)
- (Co-edited with Colin Mcfarlane) Infrastructural Lives: Urban Infrastructure in Context (Routledge, London, 2014).
- Vertical: The City From Satellites to Bunkers (Verso, London, 2016).
- Dikey Dünya: Uydulardan Sığınaklara (Koç Üniversitesi Yayınları, Istanbul, 2020)
- 수직사회 : 새로운 공간은 어떻게 계층의 격차를 강화하는가 (Chaek-se-Sang publishers, Seoul, 2020);
- 世界是垂直的 (Cite Publishing, Taipei, 2020)
