= Global Urban Research Unit =

English research centre

Coordinates: 54.980036°N 1.615664°W

- Established: 2002
- Affiliations: Newcastle University
- Director: Geoff Vigar
- Location: Newcastle, England, United Kingdom
- Website: www.ncl.ac.uk/apl/research/guru/

Global Urban Research Unit (GURU) is a research centre established in 2002 at the School of Architecture, Planning and Landscape, Newcastle University, England.

== The formation ==
GURU was formed through the merger of three successful urban research centres, providing an effective force in global urban research.

The centre incorporates:

CREUE—The Centre for Research in European Urban Environments.

One of Europe's largest and most innovative urban research centres, CREUE, since 1993, pioneered institutional analyses of urban planning, development, governance, and planning theory. It has developed nuanced analyses of the practices surrounding social polarisation and exclusion and community and housing development. And it has integrated urban design, conservation issues and transport planning thoroughly into wider urban debates.

CARDO - The Centre for Architectural Research and Development Overseas.

A leading and long-established centre exploring the links between housing, architecture, and social and economic development in the Global South. CARDO has developed different approaches to the study of the home, household enterprises, and community development and has fast-developing expertise on the social aspects of mega-urbanisation.

CUT – The Centre for Urban Technology.

An innovative and cross-disciplinary centre, CUT has, since 1994, pioneered research into the complex intersections of technologies, infrastructures and urban development. CUT has pioneered the 'socio-technical’ view of cities emphasising flow, the material bases of mobility, and the social construction of buildings and infrastructures. It has started to use this perspective to address the analytical challenges of global urbanism and urban environmental sustainability in a wide range of contexts.

== Current work ==
Harnessing the combined capabilities of these three Centres, GURU emerges as a globally significant organisation at the leading edge of contemporary thinking and research about cities. GURU’s work is organised into smaller overlapping research groups, forming a loose matrix within the overall Group so that interactions within and across thematic groups is developed to the maximum possible extent.

== List of GURU directors ==
- Stuart Cameron (2002–04)
- Jean Hillier (2005–06)
- Geoff Vigar (2006–2010)
- Ali Madanipour (2010–present)

== Scholars attached to the unit ==
- Stuart Cameron
- Simin Davoudi
- Patsy Healey
- Ali Madanipur
- Frank Moulaert
- Steve Graham
- John Pendlebury
- Mark Shuksmith
- Geoff Vigar

== See also ==
- ESDP Network
- Association of European Schools of Planning
