= The Globalized City =

2005 book edited by Frank Moulaert, Arantxa Rodriguez, and Erik Swyngedouw

The Globalized City: Economic Restructuring and Social Polarization in European Cities
- Author: Frank Moulaert, Arantxa Rodriguez, Erik Swyngedouw
- Language: English
- Series: Oxford Geographical and Environmental Studies Series
- Subject: Globalization
- Publisher: Oxford University Press
- Publication date: 25 March 2005
- Publication place: United Kingdom
- Pages: 304
- ISBN: 978-0-19-926040-9
- OCLC: 59372722
- Dewey Decimal: 307.1/216/0973 22
- LC Class: HT131 .G58 2003

The Globalized City: Economic Restructuring and Social Polarization in European Cities is a collection of discussions and case studies of large-scale urban development projects in nine European cities. It analyzes the relation between these projects and trends such as social exclusion, the emergence of new urban elites, and the consolidation of less democratic forms of urban governance.

== Summary ==
The book offers in-depth analyses of linkages between urban restructuring and social exclusion against the backdrop of trends in urban governance across the European Union, examining neo-liberal and New Urban policies that increasingly favour private investment and deregulation of labour markets. The aim is to clarify the relationship between new urban spaces and the emergence of new forms of polity, economy, and urban life which may not necessarily promote social harmony within the metropolitan areas.

== Case studies ==
The nine case studies in the book identify a number of large-scale urban development projects and look into the respective variation of governance systems at different scales. They also indicate how these local projects reflect global trends, institutional forms and strategic practices. The nine megaprojects include:

- The Europeanization of Brussels
- The Guggenheim museum in Bilbao
- The financial district in Dublin
- The science-university-technology complex 'Adlershof' in Berlin
- The 1998 World Expo in Lisbon
- The Olympic Games bid by Athens
- The Donau City in Vienna
- The Oresund project in Copenhagen
- The new business district in Naples

== See also ==
- ESDP Network
- Regional development
- Social exclusion
- Social innovation
- Urban decay
