= Erik Swyngedouw =

Geography professor

Erik Achille Marie Swyngedouw (pronounced [ˈeːrɪk ˈsʋɪŋɣədʌu]; born 30 July 1956) is professor of geography at the University of Manchester in the School of Environment, Education and Development and a member of the Manchester Urban Institute.

== Background ==
Born in Dutch-speaking Belgium and fluent in Dutch, English, French, and Spanish, he graduated from Sint-Jozefscollege, Hasselt in 1974. He graduated with an MSc in Agricultural Engineering from the Catholic University of Leuven in 1979, with a thesis focussed on agrarian change in the community of Heers. His 1985 Master in Urban and Regional Planning was also from Leuven. He earned his PhD with a thesis entitled "The production of new spaces of production" under the supervision of the renowned Marxist geographer David Harvey at Johns Hopkins University in 1991. From 1988 until 2006, Swyngedouw taught at the University of Oxford, latterly as professor of geography and was a fellow of St. Peter's College. He is currently Professor of Human Geography at the University of Manchester, England. He is also visiting professor at the University of Ghent, Belgium. He has worked and taught in the US, France, Belgium, Spain, Germany, Ecuador, and Greece.

== Scholarship ==
Swyngedouw has committed his studies to political economic analysis of contemporary capitalism, producing several major works on economic globalisation, regional development, finance, and urbanisation. His interests have also included political-ecological themes, and the transformation of nature, urban governance, politics of scale, notably water issues, in Ecuador, Spain, the UK, and elsewhere in Europe. His recent work focuses on the democratic politics and the strategies and tactics of new political movements, and the political ecology of desalination. He has published over 100 academic papers in leading academic journals in geography and cognate disciplines and in scholarly books.

== Selected publications ==
- Swyngedouw, E. with L. Albrechts and D. Van Der Wee. (1984), Een Regionale Atlas van Vlaanderen (A Regional Atlas of Flanders). Leuven University Press.
- Swyngedouw, E. with L. Albrechts, F. Moulaert, P. Roberts. (eds.) (1989), Regional Policy at the Crossroads - European Perspectives. Jessica Kingsley, London.
- Swyngedouw, E. with P. Cooke, F. Moulaert, O. Weinstein, P. Wells. (1992), Towards Global Localization: The Computing and Communications Industries in Britain and France, University College London Press, 227pp.
- Swyngedouw, E. (1995), La Crisis del Abastecimiento de Agua en Guayaquil, Ed. ILDIS, QUITO.
- Swyngedouw, E. with A. Merrifield. (eds.) (1996), The Urbanization of Injustice, Lawrence and Wishart, London, viii, 245 pp. Published in the US (in 1997) New York University Press.
- Swyngedouw, E. (1999), "Modernity and Hybridity: Nature, Regeneracionismo, and the Production of the Spanish Waterscape, 1890-1930", Annals of the Association of American Geographers, 89(3), pp. 443–465.
- Swyngedouw, E. with Getimis P., Heinelt H., Kafkalas G., Smith R. (eds.) (2002), Participatory Governance in Multi-Level Context: Concepts and Experience. Leske & Budrich, Opladen.
- Swyngedouw, E. with F. Moulaert and A. Rodriguez. (eds.) (2003), The Globalized City - Economic Restructuring and Social Polarization in European Cities. Oxford University Press.
- Swyngedouw, E. (2004), "Globalisation or 'glocalisation'? Networks, territories and rescaling", Cambridge Review of International Affairs, 17(1), pp. 25–48.
- Swyngedouw, E. (2004), Glocalisations. Temple University Press, Philadelphia, PA.
- Swyngedouw, E. (2004), Social Power and the Urbanization of Water - Flows of Power. Oxford University Press.
- Heynen, N., Kaika, M. and Swyngedouw, E. (eds.) (2005), In the Nature of Cities: Urban Political Ecology and the Politics of Urban Metabolism. Routledge, London and New York.
- Moulaert, F., E. Swyngedouw, S. Gonzalez, F. Martinelli (eds.) (2010). Can Neighbourhoods Save the City? Routledge, London and New York.
- Swyngedouw, E. (2011). Interrogating Post-Democracy: Reclaiming Egalitarian Political Spaces Political Geography, 30, pp. 370–380
- Swyngedouw, E. (2011) Designing the Post-Political city and the Insurgent Polis. Civic City Cahier 5. Bedford Press, London.
- Swyngedouw, E. & J. Wilson (eds.) (2014) The Post-Political and its Discontents: Spaces of De-politicization, Specters of Re-Politicization. Edinburgh University Press.
- Swyngedouw, E. (2015), Liquid Power: Contested Hydro-Modernities in Twentieth-Century Spain. MIT Press, Cambridge, MA.
- Swyngedouw E. (2018) Promises of the Political. MIT Press, Cambridge, MA.

== Recognition ==
- Anniversary Award from Environment and Planning A for best paper of the year "Power, Nature and the City. The Conquest of Water and The Political Ecology of Urbanization in Guayaquil, Ecuador: 1880-1980", Environment and Planning A, 29(2), pp. 311–332. (1997)
- James Blaut Memorial Award, Critical and Socialist Geography Specialty Group, American Association of Geographers (2008).
- British Academy Leverhulme Trust Senior Research Fellowship (2011)
- Honorary Doctorate. University of Malmö, Sweden, (2018)
- Honorary Doctorate. Roskilde University, Denmark, (2018)
- Member of Academia Europaea
