= Moulaert =

Moulaert is a surname. It may refer to:

- Frank Moulaert (born 1951), professor of Spatial Planning at the Catholic University of Leuven
- Georges Moulaert (1875–1958), Belgian colonial administrator
- René Moulaert (1901–1965), Belgian art director who worked on designing stage and film sets
