= Gerardo Mauricio Chávez Montaño =

Mexican basketball executive (born 1980)

Gerardo Mauricio Chavez Montaño
- Born: 1980 (age 45–46)
- Other names: Mauricio Chavez
- Education: B.A. in International Relations, Boston University; M.A. in Regional Development, Colegio de la Frontera Norte; Graduate Certificate in Women's Studies, University of Cincinnati (2006)
- Occupation: Basketball executive
- Years active: 2009–present

Gerardo Mauricio Chavez Montaño, also Mauricio Chavez, (born 1980) is the President of the Bomberos de Mexicali basketball team of the CIBACOPA Pacific Circuit of Mexican Basketball.

== Early years ==
Mauricio was born and raised in the border region of San Diego–Tijuana. He earned a Bachelor's degree in International Relations at Boston University. He also received a Master's degree in Regional Development from Colegio de la Frontera Norte, specializing in border relations between Mexico and the United States. He earned a Graduate Certificate in Women's Studies at the University of Cincinnati, (2006).

== Bomberos de Mexicali and Zonkeys de Tijuana ==
In 2009, Mauricio was recruited to launch both the Bomberos de Mexicali and Zonkeys de Tijuana basketball franchises of the CIBACOPA circuit. The first campaign in 2010 brought positive results to the teams' first season, with winning streaks and play-off bids by both of the franchises. The Easter Day earthquake of 2010 that hit Baja California inevitably affected team development, as both franchises were forced to play additional away games, and in the process, sacrifice crucial home games. Preparing for the 2011 Season, the teams have found a winning solid base. They will seek the CIBACOPA 2011 Championship from February to July 2011.

== See also ==
- List of Boston University people
- Tijuana
