= Splintering Urbanism: Networked Infrastructures, Technological Mobilities, and the Urban Condition =

2001 book by Stephen Graham and Simon Marvin

- Author: Stephen Graham and Simon Marvin
- Language: English
- Subject: Urban studies, geography, sociology of technology
- Genre: Nonfiction
- Publisher: Routledge
- Publication date: 2001
- Pages: 479
- ISBN: 9780415189651
- OCLC: 45316291
- Preceded by: Telecommunications and the City: Electronic Spaces, Urban Places (1996)

Splintering Urbanism: Networked Infrastructures, Technological Mobilities, and the Urban Condition is a 2001 book by Stephen Graham and Simon Marvin that examines how changes in the governance, ownership and technological organisation of networked infrastructures, including transport, energy, water, telecommunications and streets, have transformed the political economy and spatial organisation of contemporary cities. Using case studies from Europe, North America, Asia, Africa and Latin America, the book argues that the liberalisation, privatisation and technological restructuring of infrastructure networks have produced increasingly uneven patterns of urban connectivity, creating "premium networked spaces" alongside areas of relative disconnection and exclusion.

The book introduced the concept of splintering urbanism, which has become widely used in urban studies, geography, planning and infrastructure research to analyse the uneven social and spatial consequences of networked infrastructure development. (Note: Accumulating over 6,700 citations.) It is widely regarded as one of the foundational works in contemporary infrastructure studies and contributed to the emergence of what later became known as the "infrastructural turn" in urban research. Building on Graham and Marvin"s earlier book, Telecommunications and the City (1996), Splintering Urbanism broadened the analysis from telecommunications to infrastructure networks more generally. In 2022 the authors revisited the book in a twentieth-anniversary retrospective published in the Journal of Urban Technology.

== Background ==
Splintering Urbanism developed from Graham and Marvin's research on the changing relationship between cities, technology and infrastructure during the 1990s. Their earlier work had examined telecommunications as an emerging force reshaping urban space. In Splintering Urbanism, they extended this analysis to encompass transport, energy, water, streets and other networked infrastructures, developing a comparative framework for understanding how infrastructure systems shape urban development.

The book appeared during a period of extensive infrastructure liberalisation, privatisation and regulatory reform across many countries, alongside growing scholarly interest in globalisation, urban governance, science and technology studies and political economy. Instead of treating infrastructure as a technical background to urban life, Graham and Marvin positioned networked infrastructures as central to understanding the changing organisation of contemporary cities.

== Summary ==
The central argument of the book is that networked infrastructures are not simply neutral, engineered technical systems. But they constitute one of the principal means through which cities are organised economically, politically and socially. Graham and Marvin argue that transformations in infrastructure governance since the late twentieth century have fundamentally reshaped patterns of urban inclusion and exclusion. Instead of analysing water, energy, transport and telecommunications separately, they develop an integrated framework that treats these infrastructures as interconnected socio-technical systems whose development both reflects and reproduces wider relations of power.

The first part of the book establishes the historical and theoretical foundations of this argument. Graham and Marvin trace the emergence during the nineteenth and twentieth centuries of what they term the modern infrastructural ideal. This is the aspiration to provide universally accessible infrastructure through integrated public networks governed by principles of standardisation, cross-subsidy and universal service. They argue that this model became increasingly unstable from the 1970s onwards as neoliberal reforms, privatisation, deregulation, technological innovation and changing political priorities transformed infrastructure provision. They synthesise insights from urban political economy, large technical systems theory, actor-network theory and science and technology studies into a relational framework that conceptualises infrastructure as heterogeneous assemblages of technologies, institutions, cultural values and spatial practices. This theoretical synthesis culminates in the concept of splintering urbanism, which describes the increasing fragmentation of infrastructure provision and the uneven geographies of connection and disconnection that emerge from it.

The second part develops this framework through comparative case studies from cities across Europe, North America, Asia, Africa and Latin America. Graham and Marvin examine the emergence of gated communities, privatised streets, toll roads, premium telecommunications services, airport lounges, digital divides, surveillance systems and fortified commercial developments as examples of differentiated infrastructure provision. They argue that these developments create "premium networked spaces" serving affluent users while bypassing or disconnecting less profitable populations and neighbourhoods. The book explores the relationship between infrastructure networks and global economic restructuring, analysing financial districts, export-processing zones, logistics hubs, technopoles and global telecommunications systems. The authors argue that these spaces become increasingly integrated into transnational economic networks while simultaneously becoming detached from their surrounding urban environments.

The final part considers the broader implications of the splintering urbanism thesis. Graham and Marvin emphasise that infrastructure fragmentation is neither universal nor inevitable and discuss various forms of resistance, adaptation and political contestation. They conclude with a manifesto for a more democratic and equitable networked urbanism, arguing for renewed attention to universal access, public accountability, social mixing and the governance of urban infrastructure.

== Reception ==
The book received widespread critical acclaim across urban studies, geography, planning and science and technology studies. Reviewers consistently praised its interdisciplinary scope, ambitious synthesis of diverse theoretical traditions and extensive international range of empirical case studies. Many identified it as a significant contribution to understanding the relationship between infrastructure networks, technological change and contemporary urban transformation.

Reviewers also identified several limitations. Jennifer S. Light argued that although debates surrounding privatisation and urban inequality were already well established in the United States, the book's comparative international perspective and integration of multiple infrastructure systems represented an important advance. Rob Kitchin and R. Dean Wright described the book as a "landmark" contribution while observing that its fragmented organisation occasionally interrupted the narrative flow. Jean Hillier praised the book as a "tour de force" but questioned the political feasibility of its concluding manifesto. Barney Warf described it as an "informed, sophisticated, and erudite example of urban political economy at its very best," while Jack Burgers argued that its extensive use of citations sometimes produced a collage-like structure. Chris Benner highlighted the book's success in opening the "black box" of urban infrastructure for urban scholars.

== Influence and legacy ==
Since its publication, Splintering Urbanism has become an influential work in the study of urban infrastructure and networked urbanism. The concept of splintering urbanism has been widely adopted across geography, urban studies, planning, sociology, science and technology studies and infrastructure research to analyse the uneven development of transport, energy, water, telecommunications and digital infrastructure.

The book is widely associated with the emergence of the infrastructural turn in urban studies, contributing to a shift in scholarly attention from infrastructure as a largely technical background system to infrastructure as a central object of social, political and geographical analysis. Its analytical framework has subsequently been extended to research on digital platforms, smart cities, logistics, climate infrastructure, algorithmic governance, data centres and artificial intelligence infrastructure, while also generating debate over the continuing relevance and limitations of the splintering urbanism thesis in changing technological and political contexts.

In 2022 Graham and Marvin revisited the book in a twentieth-anniversary retrospective published in the Journal of Urban Technology, reflecting on the continuing evolution of networked infrastructures and the enduring relevance of the book's central arguments.
