= Stuart Cameron =

Stuart Cameron may refer to:

- Stuart Cameron (town planner), academic at Newcastle University in the United Kingdom
- Stuart Cameron (musician), guitarist based in Toronto, Canada
- Stuart Cameron (footballer) (born 1964), Australian rules footballer
- Stuart John Cameron (born 1939), Canadian politician

== See also ==
- Stewart Cameron (disambiguation)
