= Geoff Vigar =

Professor

Geoff Vigar is professor at the School of Architecture, Planning & Landscape, Newcastle University. He is a former Director of the Global Urban Research Unit at the university.

== Research interests ==
His research focuses on strategy development and implementation in land-use and transport planning, and the role and incorporation of social and environmental issues into governance practices in particular. His research centres on how governance institutions influence different policy pathways both in relation to planning and transport policy but also in wider City strategy-making.

== Research projects ==
- Development of Regional Transport Strategies in England including participant observation of the preparation process in North East England.
- SINGOCOM: Social innovation in territorial development funded through the European Commission’s Fifth Framework Programme.

== Publications ==
- with Porter, G., (2005), Regional Governance and Strategic Transport Policy: the case of North East England, European Spatial Research and Policy, 12(1) pp89–108.
- Graham, SDN.; Healey, P. (July 2005). "Searching for the City in Spatial Strategies". Urban Studies. 42 (8).
- with Haggett, C. (2004), Tilting at Windmills, Town and Country Planning, October, 73 (10), pp288–290.
- (2004), Researching Wind Energy Developments: Perspectives from Planning Theory, Working Paper for ESRC Tilting at Windmills project, Newcastle University: Newcastle.
