= Judith Innes =

American academic (1942–2020)

Judith E. Innes (1942 – April 14, 2020) was an American academic. She ended her career as professor emerita at the College of Environmental Design at the University of California, Berkeley. Her academic work focused on the areas of public policy, planning theory and process, collaborative planning, communicative planning, and multiple areas of urban planning including transportation and water planning. She held a Ph.D. in Urban Studies and Planning from MIT and a B.A. in English Literature from Harvard University. Innes died on April 14, 2020, aged 78.

== See also ==
- Urban planning
- Communicative planning
- Transportation planning
- Theories of urban planning
