= Stewart Cameron =

Stewart Cameron may refer to

- Stewart Cameron (cartoonist) (1912–1970), Canadian editorial and cowboy cartoonist
- Stewart Cameron (cricketer) (1920–2001), New Zealand cricketer
- Stewart Cameron (nephrologist) (1934–2023), British nephrologist

== See also ==
- Stuart Cameron (disambiguation)
