= Stazione Sperimentale per l'Industria delle Conserve Alimentari =

Italian research institute

Coordinates: 44°48′12.9″N 10°20′22.8″E

The Stazione Sperimentale per l'Industria delle Conserve Alimentari (SSICA) (Experimental Station for the Food Preserving Industry) is a special Agency of the Chamber of Commerce in Parma.

It is an Institute for applied research, established in Parma in 1922, and operating on a national scale with the specific aim of promoting the technical and technological progress in the food preserving industry. In 1999 SSICA was transformed into a public economic institution with important legal, operational and administrative modifications which, however, have left its mission and functions unchanged.

== Other relative Experimental Stations ==
- Stazione Sperimentale per le Industrie degli Oli e dei Grassi
- Stazione Sperimentale per le Industrie delle Essenze e dei Derivati dagli Agrumi
