= Mediterranea University of Reggio Calabria =

Public university in Reggio Calabria, Italy

Coordinates: 38.1208°N 15.6592°E

- Università degli Studi Mediterranea di Reggio Calabria
- Type: Public
- Established: 1968
- Affiliations: UNIMED – ESDP
- Rector: Santo Marcello Zimbone
- Faculty: 287
- Administrative staff: 230
- Students: 10,200
- Location: (Italy) Reggio Calabria, Italy
- Campus: Feo di Vito 94.88 acres (38.40 ha)
- Sports teams: CUS Reggio Calabria
- Colors: Cerulean goldenrod
- Website: www.unirc.it

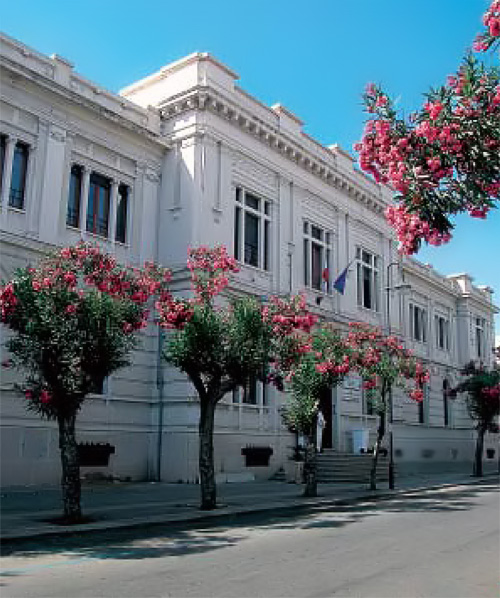
a view of Mediterranea University of Reggio Calabria campus

Mediterranea University of Reggio Calabria (Italian: Università degli Studi Mediterranea di Reggio Calabria), also referred to as Mediterranea University or University of Reggio Calabria, or simply UNIRC, is an Italian public research university, located in Reggio Calabria, Italy. In 2021, it is the third best university in the state.

It was founded in 1968, and is one of the youngest universities in the country. UNIRC combines its commitment in research and teaching: three faculties (Architecture, Engineering, Agricultural Science), are dedicated to the territory, creating an "Environment Polytechnic" with a strong propensity to the themes of architecture, landscape, urbanism, infrastructure associated at the green economy. The faculty of Law, study from the economic issues to those related to archeology and artistic heritage. The university provides undergraduate, graduate and post-graduate education, in addition to a range of double degree programs.

The 2012 edition, of the ranking list of Italian public universities – written by the newspaper Il Sole 24 Ore – based on indicators of quality, puts Mediterranea University of Reggio Calabria, to first place in the South Italy and Insular Italy, and in particular, its school of architecture is one of the best in the country.

== History ==
=== The creation of IUSA ===
On 6 December 1967, with a request of the Commissioner of the prefect of the Consortium for the Institute of Architecture of Reggio Calabria the University of Reggio Calabria was founded. The legal recognition comes with the Presidential Decree (no. 1543), of 17 June 1968 which marks the birth of the Free University Institute of Architecture. Salvatore Boscarino, a professor at the University of Catania, held the first lesson, on 18 December 1967, titled "Elements of Architecture and survey monuments".

=== The university became 'Mediterranea' ===
In the 90s, the construction of great and modern buildings started, of the new campus located at Feo di Vito. In 2001, the rector Alessandro Bianchi, professor of Urban Planning, who remained in office until May 2006, the date of appointment as Minister of the Italian Republic for the Transport of the Prodi government, changed the name of the university. The name of the university became "Mediterranea University of Reggio Calabria", with the ambition to become a cultural and scientific centre in the Mediterranean basin. In 2014, the university started a partnership (research teams, teachers and students mobility, programming of common teaching activities) together with the Chongqing University, in China.

== Awards and Events ==
=== Rankings ===
The 2012 edition of the Italian public universities ranking list – written by the Italian national newspaper Il Sole 24 Ore – based on the analysis of quality indicators – puts Mediterranea University of Reggio Calabria in first place in South Italy and Insular Italy, and 31st nationally. 39.45% of teachers have successfully participated in the "PRIN" (Research Programs of National Interest) and "FIRB" (Fund for Investments in Basic Research). UNIRC was ranked 10th for research funding, with 82.7% of research funded by external bodies. In 2010/2011, the university ranked 18th among 63 public universities for student performance, with 23.3% achieving final marks of 90 or above. For the "dispersion", or missing entries in its second year in 2010/2011, Reggio Calabria was in 16th place with 11.0%, behind universities such as Politecnico di Milano, University Iuav of Venice and University of Turin.

=== Honorary degrees ===
The Mediterranean University has conferred honorary degrees on:

- Giovanni Astengo
- Jaime Gil-Aluja (President of the Royal Academy of Economics and Finance – Spain)
- Pasqual Maragal i Mira (Governor of the Autonomous Region of Catalonia and the mayor of Barcelona)
- Federico Gorio
- Pietro Larizza
- Mimmo Rotella
- Francesco Rosi
- Umberto Eco
- José Carlos Principe

=== Collaboration agreement ===
On 30 July 2013, in the presence of the Prefect of Reggio Calabria, Vittorio Piscitelli, a collaboration agreement was signed between the Mediterranea University of Reggio Calabria and the special agency Stazione Sperimentale per le Industrie delle Essenze e dei Derivati dagli Agrumi (SSEA). The agreement provides for an investment of 5 million euros in equipment, and the redevelopment of the SSEA experimental field to include laboratories for analysis and certification of essential oils and food ingredients.

== Organization ==
=== Faculties ===
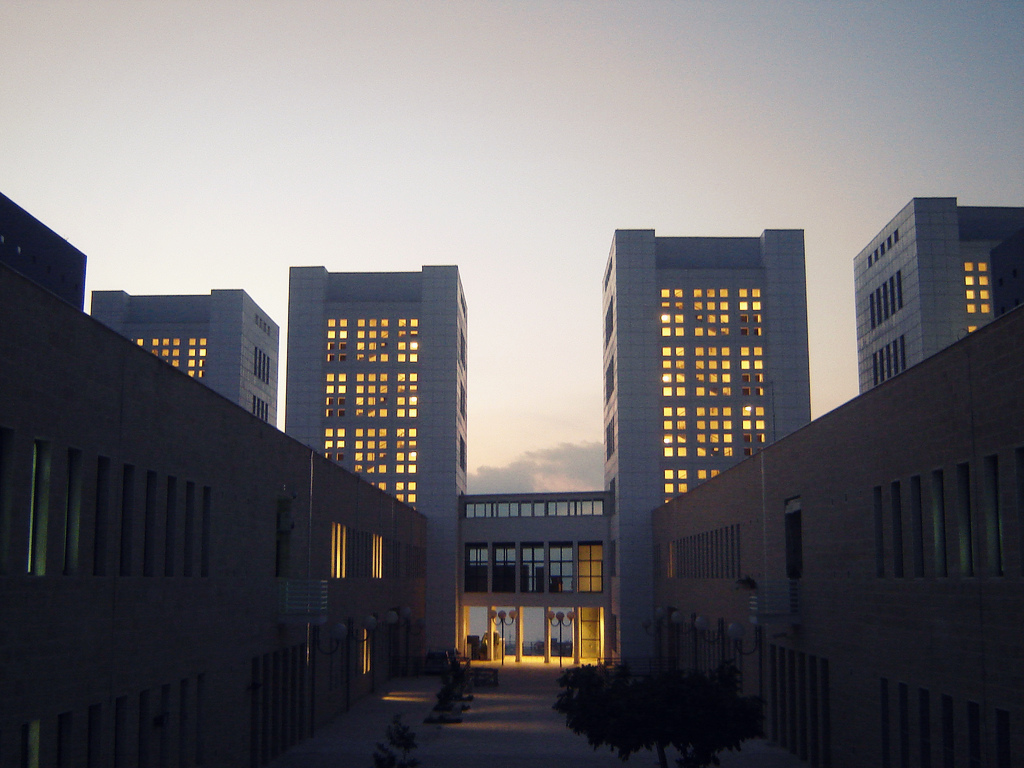
Courtyard of the Faculty of Architecture

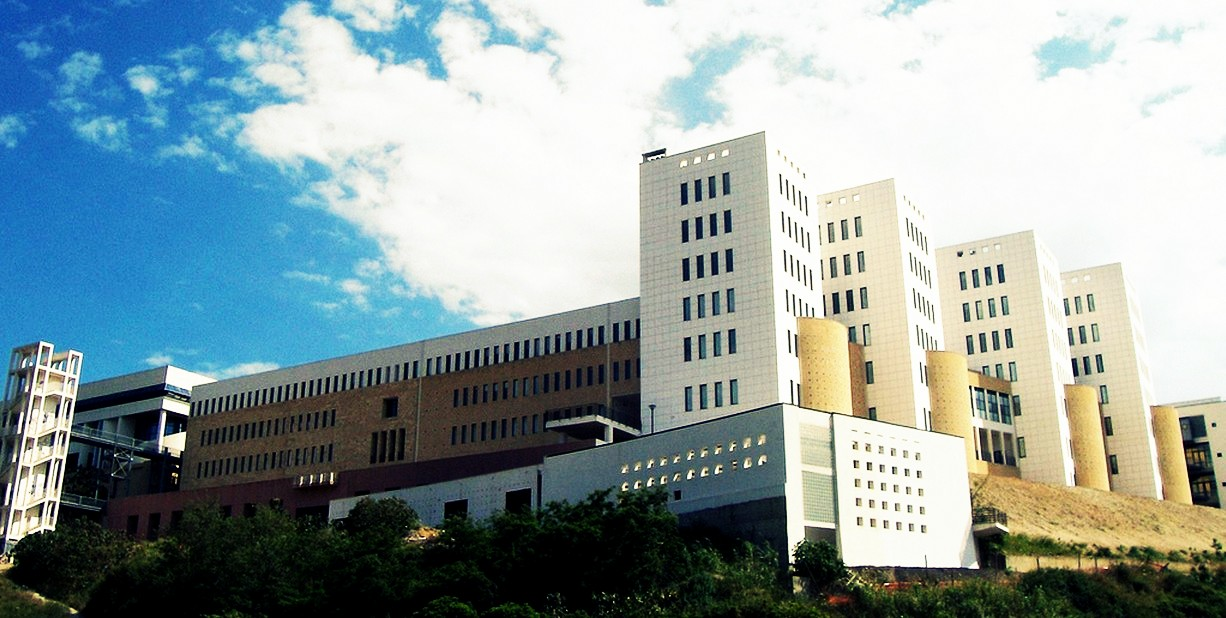
The Faculty of Architecture, view by Viale Manfroce

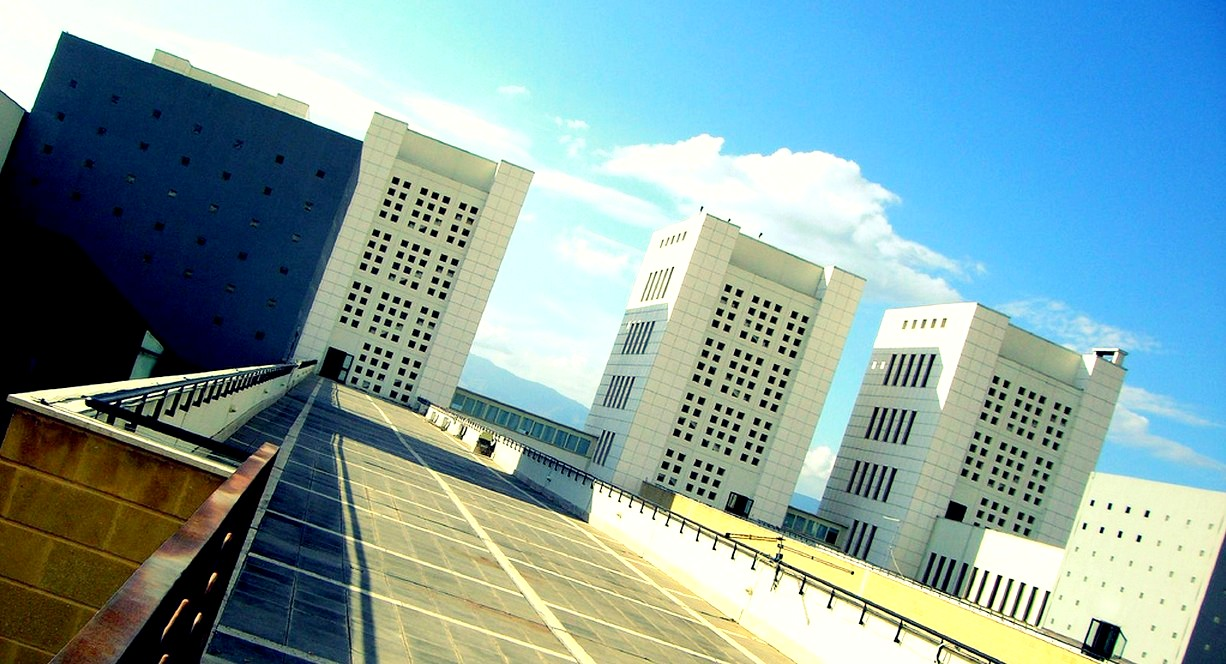
White towers of the Faculty of Architecture

- Faculty of Agricultural Science
- Faculty of Architecture
- Faculty of Engineering
- Faculty of Law

=== Departments ===
The departments of the university are an organ in which they are awarded, by statute, the duties of promoting, organizing and conducting scientific research. Promotes, coordinates and manages the research activities conducted in their area, while respecting the autonomy of individual teachers and scientific researchers and their right to go directly to research funding. It guarantees the access to resources, according to the criteria set out in the rules. Organizes activities necessary for the attainment of doctoral research. Expresses opinions and proposals on the request, the destination and the filling of posts of professor and researcher role, limited to the scientific areas of expertise of the department. The advisory functions of promotion and coordination of research activities are delegated to the Board of Directors of the department. As part of the reform Gelmini, were adopted from the academic year 2012–2013, 6 departments:

Faculty	Name of Department	Abbreviation
Agricultural Science	Dipartimento di Agraria; Department of Agricultural Science	-
Architecture	Dipartimento di Patrimonio, Architettura, Urbanistica; Department of Heritage, Architecture, Urban Planning	PAU
Architecture	Dipartimento di Architettura e Territorio; Department of Architecture and Territory	DARTE
Engineering	Dipartimento di Ingegneria Civile, dell'Energia, dell'Ambiente e dei Materiali; Department of Civil Engineering, of Energy, of Environment and of Materials	DICEAM
Engineering	Dipartimento di Ingegneria dell'Informazione, delle Infrastrutture e dell'Energia Sostenibile; Department of Information Engineering, of Infrastructures and Sustanaible Energy	DIIES
Law	Dipartimento di Giurisprudenza ed Economia; Department of Law and Economy	-

== Research ==
=== Doctor of Philosophy (PhD) ===
==== International Doctorate of Philosophy (IDP) ====
Urban Regeneration and Economic Development (Program: CLUDs-Commercial Local Urban Districts)

The research project is supposed to last three years, with the intention to extent – after defining and experiencing the CLUDs Action Plan in selected Urban Areas – the research project to develop related aspects such as the impact on public services supply (public transportation, safety, waste, etc.), the impact on the rate of energy safe by increasing the use of appropriate technology for housing and building, the impact on new service to business start up, the impact of structural change in rural-urban pattern of the city.

The partnership is characterized by a common scientific field of study that is the city and its multidisciplinary aspects, concerning the general theme of urban policy and planning. With respect this common theme each partner acquires an important role in the academic and scientific international studies. The universities along Mediterranea that participating in the program are:

- (Finland) Aalto University– (YtkLand and Use Planning and Use Studies Group)
- (Italy) Sapienza University of Rome – (Centro di Ricerca sulla Valorizzazione e gestione dei centri storici minori / Fo.Cu.S.)
- (United Kingdom) University of Salford– (School of the Built Environment / SOBE)
- (United States) Northeastern University – (Department of Economics – School of Public Policy and Urban Affairs / NEUSUP)
- (United States) San Diego State University – (School of Public Affairs / SDSU)

=== Schools ===
School of specialization for the legal profession (I and II year), with national programming exam:

- Court – Forensic
- Notary

School of High Formation in Architecture and Archeology of Classical City

== Student body ==
Most of the students come from Sicily and Calabria, but there is a good percentage of students coming from other Italian regions. The situation is different for foreigners. With the agreement between the Italian Republic and the Republic of China, were distributed the provisions governing the university registrations of foreign nationals. The program "Marco Polo", provides that the seats allocated for Chinese citizens, who can subscribe to the Mediterranea University of Reggio Calabria, are: 30 in the Faculty of Agricultural Science, 50 in the Faculty of Architecture, 18 in the Faculty of Engineering and 20 in the Faculty of Law. In addition at the UNIRC are active, thanks to the Treaty of Friendship, Partnership and Cooperation between Italy and Libya, numerous scholarships for Libyan students who want to study in Italian universities.

=== Student facilities ===
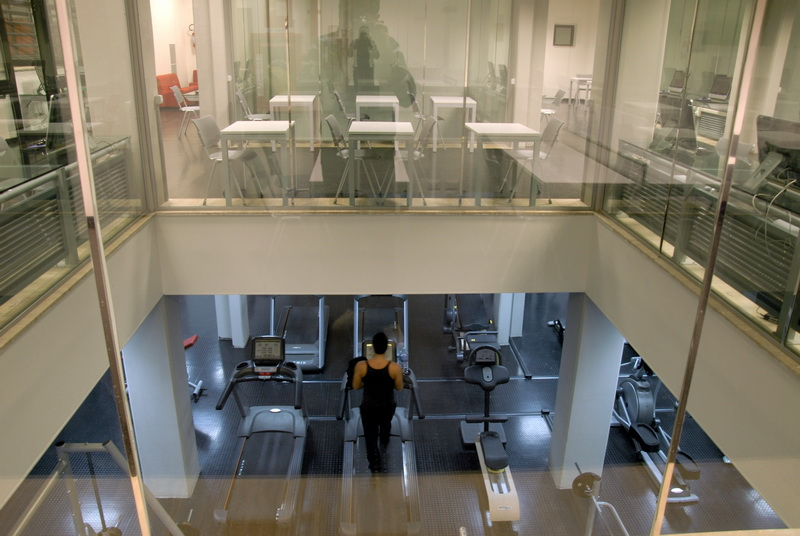
Gym

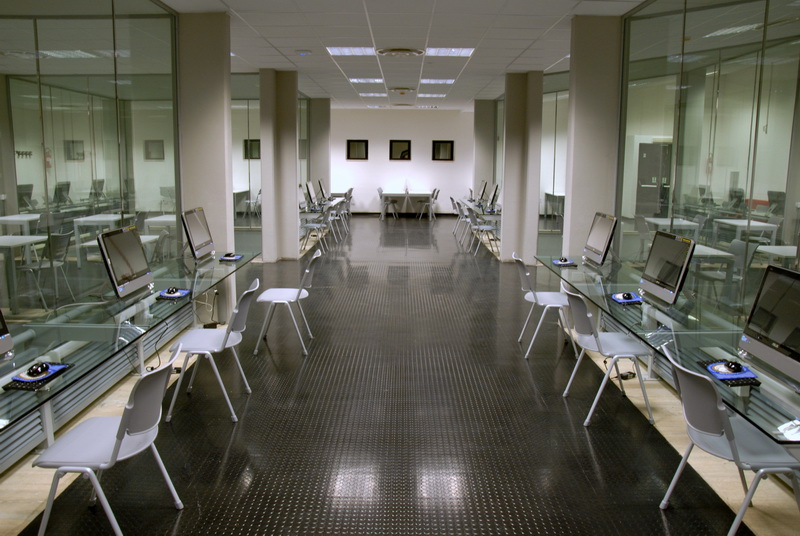
Learning Centres

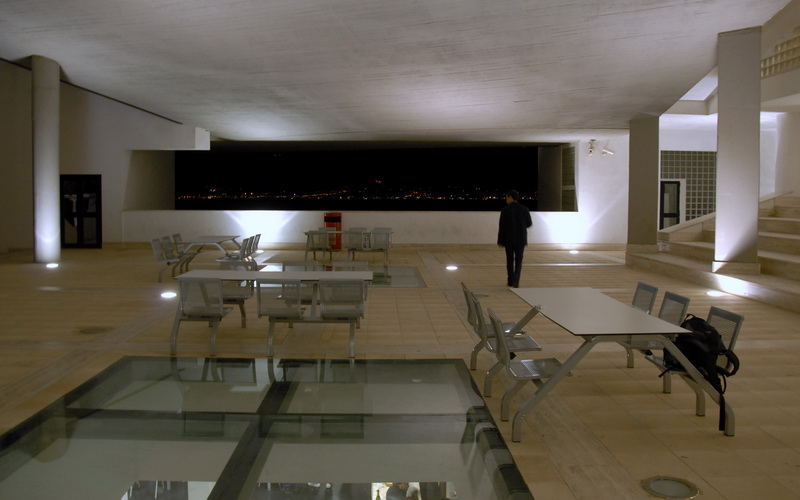
Outdoor Area

- 4 Libraries: one for each faculty, with a collection of about 60,000 monographs, 500 periodicals, some 5,000 electronic journals and databases disciplines.
- Learning Centres: the space is a public meeting and at the same time of cultural production. Individual and group study, meetings and conferences, multimedia presentations, video conferencing, on-line consultation.

== Erasmus and Foreign courses ==
The Erasmus (European Community Action Scheme for the Mobility of University Students) offers the opportunity to study at a European university or an internship in a country inside the EU.

Since 2005, every year, is organized during the summer months, an advanced course in English language, in collaboration with the St. Andrews University in Scotland. The study-tour is developed in the cities of Edinburgh, Glasgow and Dundee, as well as the Lakes of the Highlands.

== Rectors ==
Rectors of the new University of Reggio Calabria.

Years	Rector
1982–1989	Antonio Quistelli
1989–1999	Rosario Pietropaolo
1999–2006	Alessandro Bianchi
2006–2012	Massimo Giovannini
2012–2018	Pasquale Catanoso
2018–present	Santo Marcello Zimbone

== See also ==
- Mediterranean University Union
- ESDP-Network
- List of Italian universities
