= Simin Davoudi =

- Born: 15 May 1957 (age 69); Mashhad, Iran
- Scientific career
- Fields: Spatial Planning, Governance, Environment and Sustainability, Polycentric Development
- Workplaces: Newcastle University

Simin Davoudi FAcSS is Professor of Environmental Policy and Planning at Newcastle University. She is Past President of the Association of European Schools of Planning (AESOP) and, as coordinator of the Planning Research Network, advised the Department of Communities and Local Government on its research priorities until 2007. Currently, she is a member of the DCLG Expert Panel on Housing market and Planning, and is expert advisor for the DG Environment of European Commission for Urban Environment.

At Newcastle University, she is affiliated with School of Architecture, Planning and Landscape, Institute for Research on Environment and Sustainability, and Global Urban Research Unit.

== Career ==
Simin has a degree in architecture (B.Arch, 1982) from Iran National University, Tehran. In 1988, she completed MPhil in Town and Country Planning at Newcastle University where she also worked as a Research Associate until 1996 while working as a part-time Planning Officer with Northumberland County Council. She was subsequently appointed as Lecturer at The Bartlett, University College London. In 2000, she became Professor of Planning and Environment, and Director of Centre for Urban Development and Environmental Management, at Leeds Metropolitan University. In 2006 she moved to Newcastle.

=== Affiliations ===
She is member of The Royal Town Planning Institute (RTPI), The Regional Studies Association (RSA), and The Town and Country Planning Association (TCPA). She is also the founding member of the Editorial team of the 21st Century Society: Journal of the Academy of Socials Sciences, at Academy of Social Sciences (AcSS).

=== Distinguished positions ===
- Wibaut Visiting Professor, Amsterdam Institute for Metropolitan and International Development Studies, University of Amsterdam, 2007
- Senior Vice-president, Association of European Schools of Planning (AESOP) 2006–07
- President, AESOP 2004–06
- Co-ordinator, Planning Research Network, advising Department of Communities and Local Government (DCLG), 2003–07

== Publications ==
=== Journal articles ===
- Evidence-Based Planning: Rhetoric and Reality. DISP 2006, 165(2), 14–24.
- The evidence – policy interface in strategic waste planning for urban environments: the 'technical' and the 'social' dimensions. Environment and Planning C: Government and Policy 2006, 24(5), 681–700.
- (with Neil Evans) The challenge of governance in regional waste planning. Environment and Planning C: Governance and Policy 2005, 23(4), 493–517.
- Polycentricity in European Spatial Planning: From an Analytical Tool to a Normative Agenda. European Planning Studies 2003, 11(8), 979–999.

=== Books and chapters ===
- (with Strange, I.) (eds.) Conceptions of Space and Place in Strategic Spatial Planning, The RTPI Library Series, London: Routledge, 2009.
- Territorial Cohesion, European social model and spatial policy research. In: Faludi, A, ed. Territorial cohesion and European model of society. Cambridge, Mass: Lincoln Institute for Land Policy, 2007, pp. 81–104.
- (with Layard, A and Batty, S.) (eds.). Planning for a Sustainable Future. London: Spon, 2001.

== See also ==
- Association of European Schools of Planning
- Global Urban Research Unit
