= Communicative planning =

Approach to urban planning

Communicative planning is an approach to urban planning that gathers stakeholders and engages them in a process to make decisions together in a manner that respects the positions of all involved. It is also sometimes called collaborative planning among planning practitioners or collaborative planning model.

== History and theory ==
Since the 1970s, communicative planning theory has formed based on several key understandings. These key points include the notions that communication and reasoning come in diverse forms, knowledge is socially constructed, and people’s diverse interests and preferences are formed out of their social contexts. Communicative theory also draws on Foucauldian analyses of power in that it recognizes that power relations exist in practice and have the ability to oppress individuals. Specific to a community and urban planning context, communicative theory acknowledges that planners' own actions, words, lived experiences, and communication styles have an effect on the planning process the planner is facilitating. Finally, communicative planning theory advances the idea that planning happens in everyday practice and social relations, and consensus-building can be used to organize people's thoughts and move past traditional ways of knowing and decision-making.

In the 1990s, a number of planning scholars began writing about a new orientation to urban planning theory that moved away from the prevalent rational approach to planning. Judith Innes is credited with coining the term "communicative planning" in her article Planning Theory’s Emerging Paradigm: Communicative Action and Interactive Practice. Innes' tries to bridge the gap between planning theories and planning in practice, and offers consensus-building as a tool for urban planners to create collaborative and engaging planning environments that allow different stakeholders to participate.

Around the same time as this article was published, Patsy Healey also published a number of planning theory texts exploring communicative and collaborative planning. Drawing on the theory of Jürgen Habermas in particular, Healey's work focuses on the impact that communicative acts (which can be in spoken or written form) have on a community planning process.

The emerging field of therapeutic planning is closely related to communicative planning. Therapeutic planning operates on the basis that communities can experience collective trauma, including from past planning processes, and that carefully facilitated community engagement can act as catalysts for community-wide healing. Some planning practitioners use untraditional planning approaches, such as filmmaking and other artistic media, to engage community members in therapeutic planning processes.

== Scholars and texts ==
This section provides a short list of works written by planning academics on the subject of collaborative planning.

Author	Title	Year
Patsy Healey	The communicative turn in planning theory and its implications for spatial strategy formation	1993
Patsy Healey	Collaborative Planning: Shaping Places in Fragmented Societies	1997
Patsy Healey	Collaborative planning in a stakeholder society	1998
Patsy Healey	Collaborative Planning in Perspective	2003
Judith Innes and David E Booher	Consensus Building and Complex Adaptive Systems: A Framework for Evaluating Collaborative Planning	1999
Judith Innes and David E Booher	Network Power in Collaborative Planning	2002
Judith Innes and David E Booher	Consensus Building as Role Playing and Bricolage: Toward a Theory of Collaborative Planning	2007

== Communicative process and tools ==
In a communicative planning process, planning practitioners play more of a facilitative role. They often act as a ‘knowledge mediator and broker’ to help reframe problems in order to promote more creative thinking about possible solutions.

Throughout this process, information should be produced collectively by the full range of stakeholders who may be affected by the outcome of the process. In particular, all of the stakeholders should be involved in negotiating both the problem definition and the solution together. In doing so, solutions to conflicts amongst stakeholders may be re-framed as ‘win-win’, as opposed to the ‘zero sum’ mindset which occurs when stakeholders are bargaining on the basis of their own fixed interests. Consensus-building is an important part of this collective meaning-making process, as information is discussed and validated within the group of stakeholders, resulting in information which holds more significance to the group.

To aid in consensus-building efforts, power should be distributed amongst the stakeholders such that they are equals in the process. Openness and trust are also crucial for building consensus. The objectives, underlying assumptions, and positions of these stakeholders should be considered along with the uncertainties about future conditions, such as population growth, and decisions which are linked to other decisions. It is important to have the stakeholders identify this information for themselves, as it will help reduce the biases present in both analyses driven by only one future and position-based discussions, as well as bring to the forefront any conflicts between the underlying values of the stakeholders. By considering this broad range of information, commonalities between different stakeholders may be identified, which can help build consensus. However, this cannot guarantee consensus, as positions might in fact be too different. In order to deal with the challenges that arise from positions being very different and the increasing complexity of analysis required, new models of collaboration are needed which build on various principles of conflict management, including engaging early and often.

== Case studies ==
The Neighbourhood Revitalization Program (NRP) - 1990

In 1990, the city of Minneapolis, Minnesota launched a 20-year program designed to empower residents in local decision making and share community planning responsibilities among residential, government and private stakeholders. To combat the dwindling standard of living within Minneapolis neighbourhoods, the NRP was conceptualized as a means of involving citizens in the prioritization of revitalization efforts. The Minneapolis government divided 400 million dollars between 81 neighbourhood organizations who utilized the funding over two decades to assess priorities, reach consensus and implement neighbourhood improvement projects. Within the first decade of the NRP, 48% of funding was used for upgrading housing and 16% went towards job creation and economic development. Other priorities included public safety, the preservation of green space and improving transportation infrastructure.

Through the completion and adoption of 66 unique neighbourhood plans, stakeholders from various organizations including the general public, Minneapolis Public Library, Minneapolis Parks and Recreation, Public Works, Housing Inspection and Hennepin County all came together to articulate and agree upon feasible and mutually beneficial neighbourhood directives. With emphasis placed on citizen participation, municipal planners took on an advisory role and assisted neighbourhood planning organizations in encouraging participation, engaging a diverse audience and reviewing completed plans through a technical lens.

Despite the creation of Participation Agreements which stood as formal commitments to holding an inclusive engagement process, the NRP has been criticized for a lack of representation from all neighbourhood members. While the NRP has been applauded for its communicative and collaborative values, critics point to cases of exclusion and the enormous amount of continuous time and energy required for its success as main drawbacks.

Seattle's Neighbourhood Planning Program - 1994

In 1994, Seattle developed the Neighbourhood Planning Program (NPP) in response to outcry from the general public surrounding a lack of involvement in a recently completed comprehensive plan. The NPP intended to build a partnership between residents and the local government and provided neighbourhoods with the choice to create their own unique local plan or continue with the comprehensive plan. While these neighbourhood plans had to be consistent with the broad goals of the comprehensive plan, participating neighbourhoods were afforded the opportunity to identify their own priorities and provide a list of recommendations to the city. Initially, each participating neighbourhood was given 10,000 dollars to begin a communicative engagement process and identify a vision for their local community. Additional funding for the planning stage would not be rewarded until the City felt as though enough stakeholders and community representatives had been included in the process. Once the visioning process was deemed to be inclusive and rigorous, the city provided each neighbourhood with between 60,000-100,000 dollars to develop a plan.

In total, 38 neighbourhoods participated and developed their own neighbourhood plan for the municipality to follow. Before approving each neighbourhood plan, the municipality would hold public hearings in the neighbourhood to share the plan and ensure there was consensus among all the residents in the area. By 1999, the City had adopted these plans and began implementing the shared visions of each neighbourhood. Each plan varied significantly as each neighbourhood was afforded the opportunity to hire their own planner or consultants to assist them in the process. Planning professionals participated in the process mainly as mediators who helped guide participatory sessions and facilitated the consensus-building process.

Between 20,000 and 30,000 residents participated directly in the NPP. The program has been recognized as a successful example of communicative planning and collaborative governance due to the high level of participation and the frequency with which consensus was genuinely reached.

== Challenges and critiques ==
Critiques of Innes, Healey, and communicative planning focus on the planning processes and outcomes.

Older critiques of communicative planning theory question whether the theory they find idealist can translate a consensus-based process into authentic outcomes. They also question whether consensus is a valuable goal when they see critical planning decisions as being made gradually. Additional critiques relate to power: who has the power to exclude and include stakeholders and whether stakeholders will use their power to manipulate the consensus building process (given that consensus must be reached). Older critiques of communicative planning practice also see a lack of real world outcomes from the communicative planning processes because deeper political and institutional change is needed first.

Judith Innes directly responded to these critiques in her article Consensus Building: Clarifications for the Critics. Additionally, she expanded her description of the consensus building process and communicative planning's roots.

Newer critiques argue collaborative planning is a way to maintain larger political and institutional systems while creating a process that only seems to better represent the public. They see collaborative planning as a way to keep neoliberals in power and political systems stable, rather than creating real changes to the governing system.
