= Stazione Sperimentale per le Industrie delle Essenze e dei Derivati dagli Agrumi =

Italian research institute

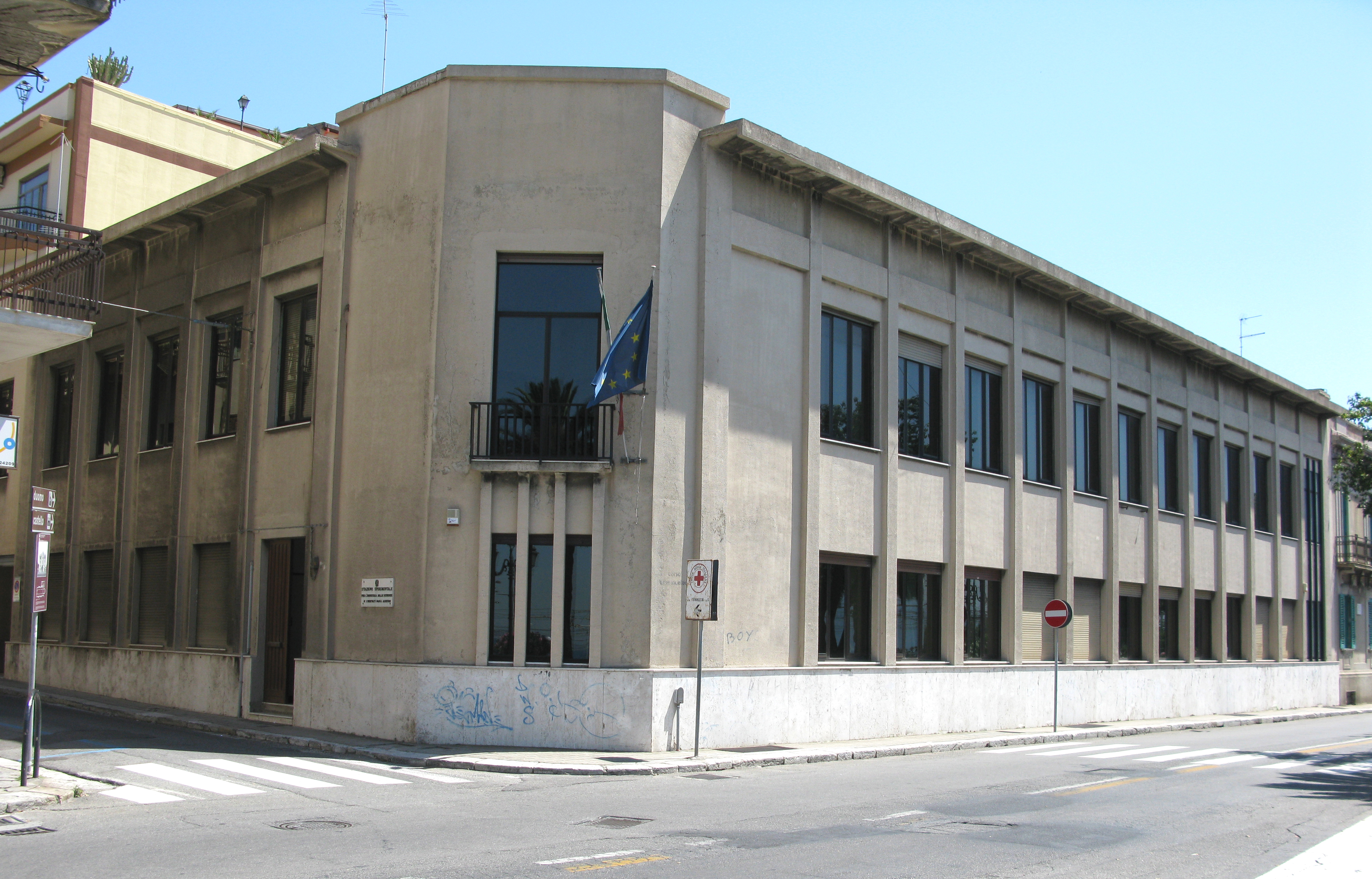
Experimental Station for Essential Oil and Citrus Products

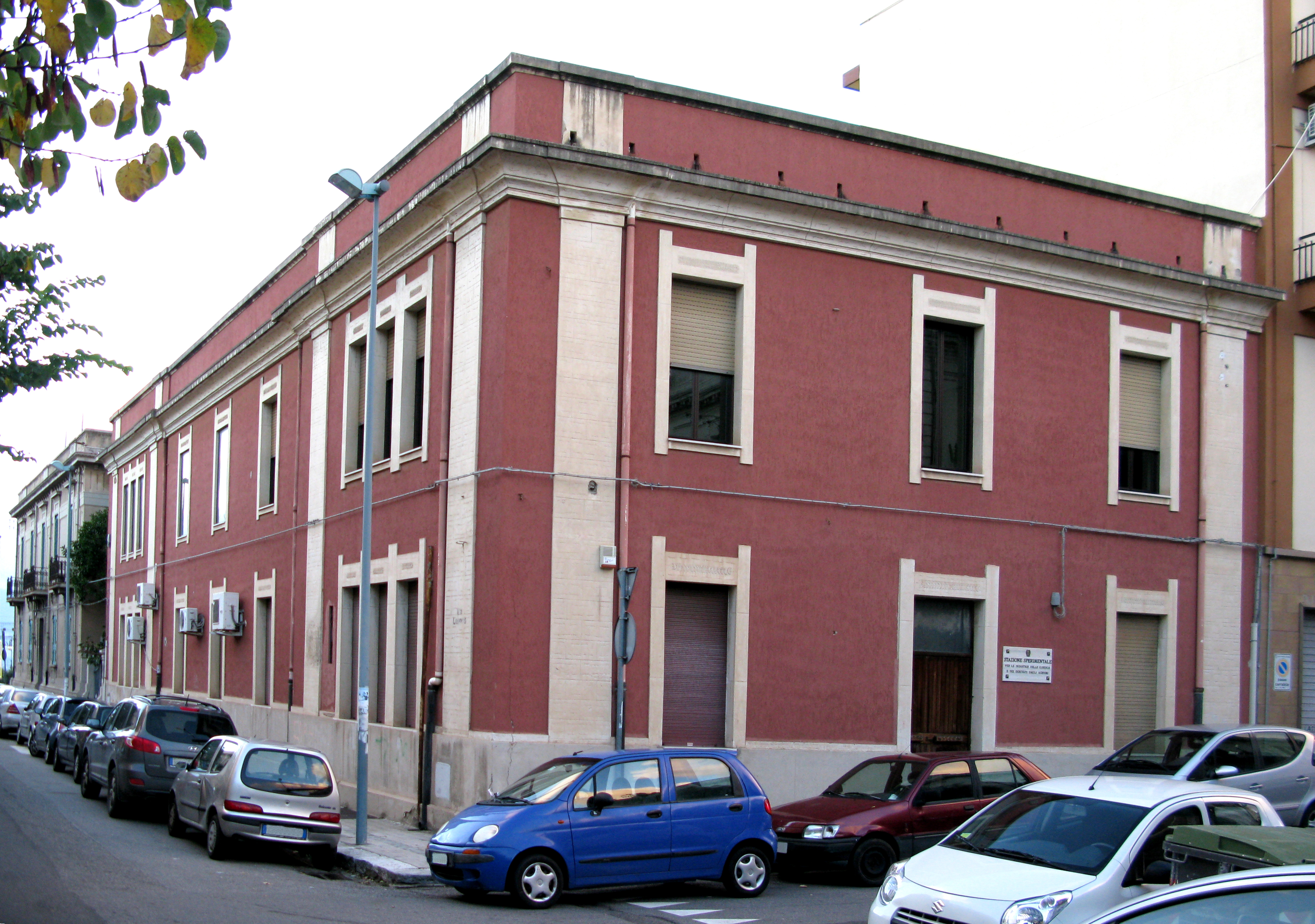
SSEA rear view

The Stazione Sperimentale per le Industrie delle Essenze e dei Derivati dagli Agrumi (SSEA) (Experimental Station for the Industry of the Essential oils and Citrus products) is a special Agency of the Chamber of Commerce in Reggio Calabria.

== Overview ==
It is an Institute for applied research, established in Reggio Calabria in 1918, and operating on a national scale with the specific aim of promoting the technical and technological progress in the essential oils and citrus by-products industry. In 1999 SSEA was transformed into a public economic institution with important legal, operational and administrative modifications which, however, have left its mission and functions unchanged.

The Station was the Quality Control Body for the essential oil Bergamotto di Reggio Calabria DOP.

On 30 July 2013, attended by the Prefect of Reggio Calabria, was signed a collaboration agreement between the special Agency SSEA and the Mediterranea University of Reggio Calabria. The agreement provides for an investment of 5 million euros in equipment, and the redevelopment of the experimental field as a field catalog.

== SSEA Directors ==
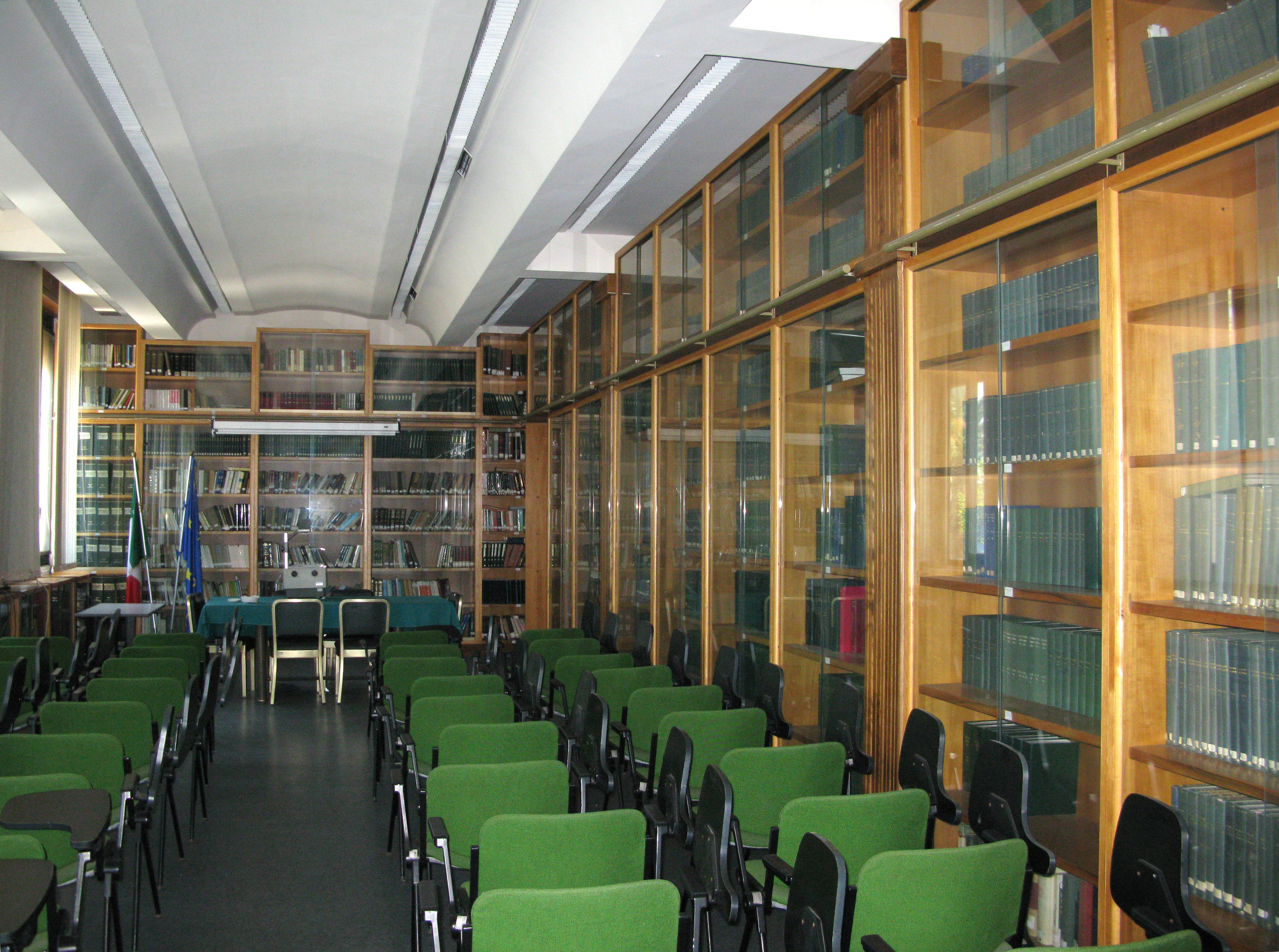
SSEA library

- Alfredo Parrozzani (1918 - 1929)
- Francesco La Face (1929 - 1969)
- Angelo Di Giacomo (1970 - 1991)
- Maria Calvarano (1991 - 1998)
- Domenico Castaldo (1998 - 2005)
- Mario Mazza (Special Commissioner) (2006)
- Marcello Parrinello (Special Commissioner) (2007 - 2010)
- Natina Crea (2010 - In Office)

== Experimental field ==
38°5′56.91″N 15°38′20.81″E

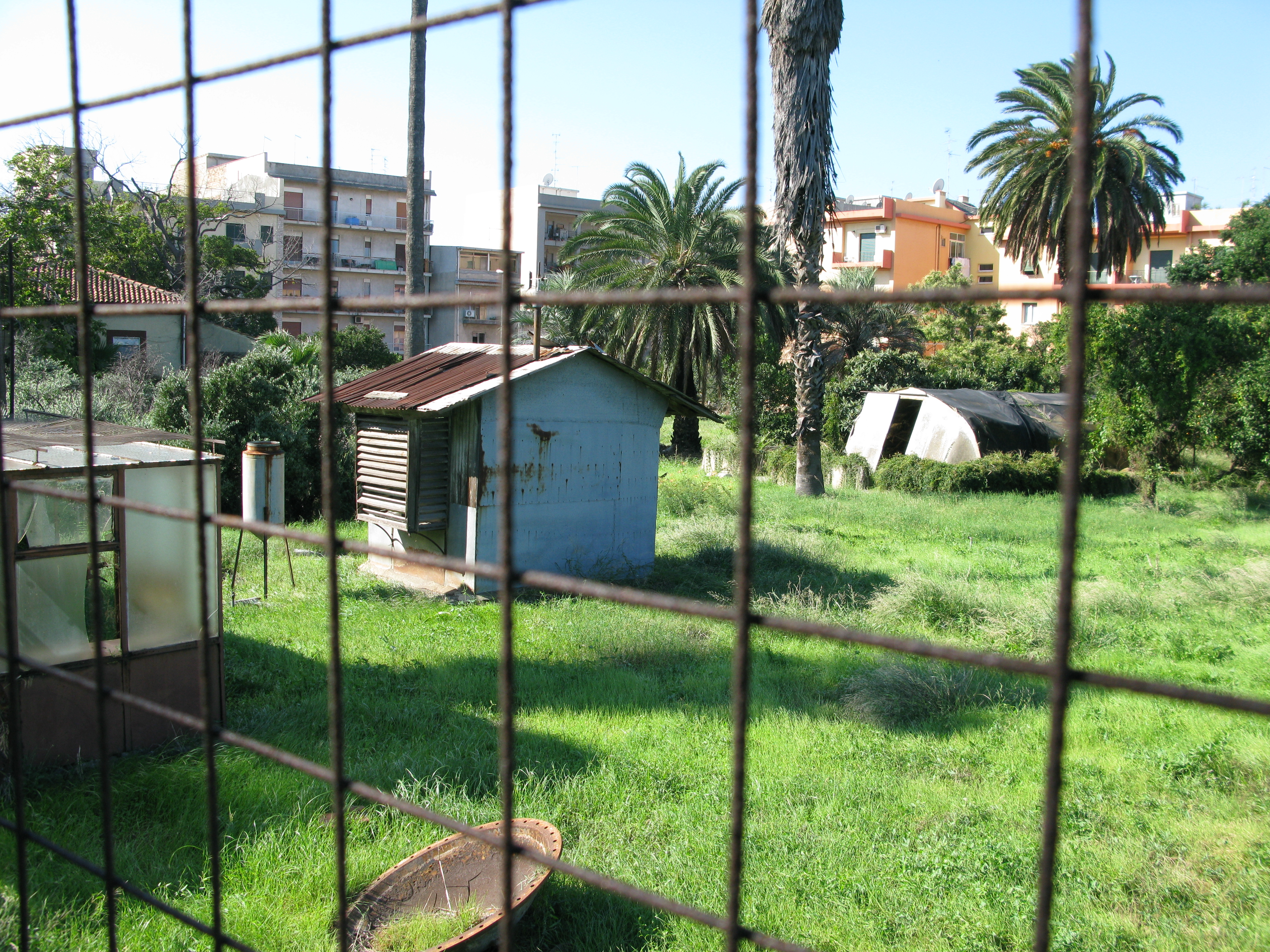
SSEA Experimental field

The Station has a field of about half a hectare, mistakenly called "botanical garden", used in the past as experimental field. At present the field is unused.

== See also ==
- Bergamot orange

Other relative Experimental Stations

- Stazione Sperimentale per le Industrie degli Oli e dei Grassi
- Stazione Sperimentale per l'Industria delle Conserve Alimentari

== Bibliography ==
- (in Italian and English) Francesco Gionfriddo e Domenico Castaldo (2004). "Ridefinizione dei parametri analico-composizionali dell'olio essenziale di bergamotto estratto a freddo / Ridefinition of analytical compositional parameters for "cold pressed" bergamot essential oil". Essenze Derivati Agrumari (74): 151–152.
