= Patsy Healey =

British urban planner (born 1940)

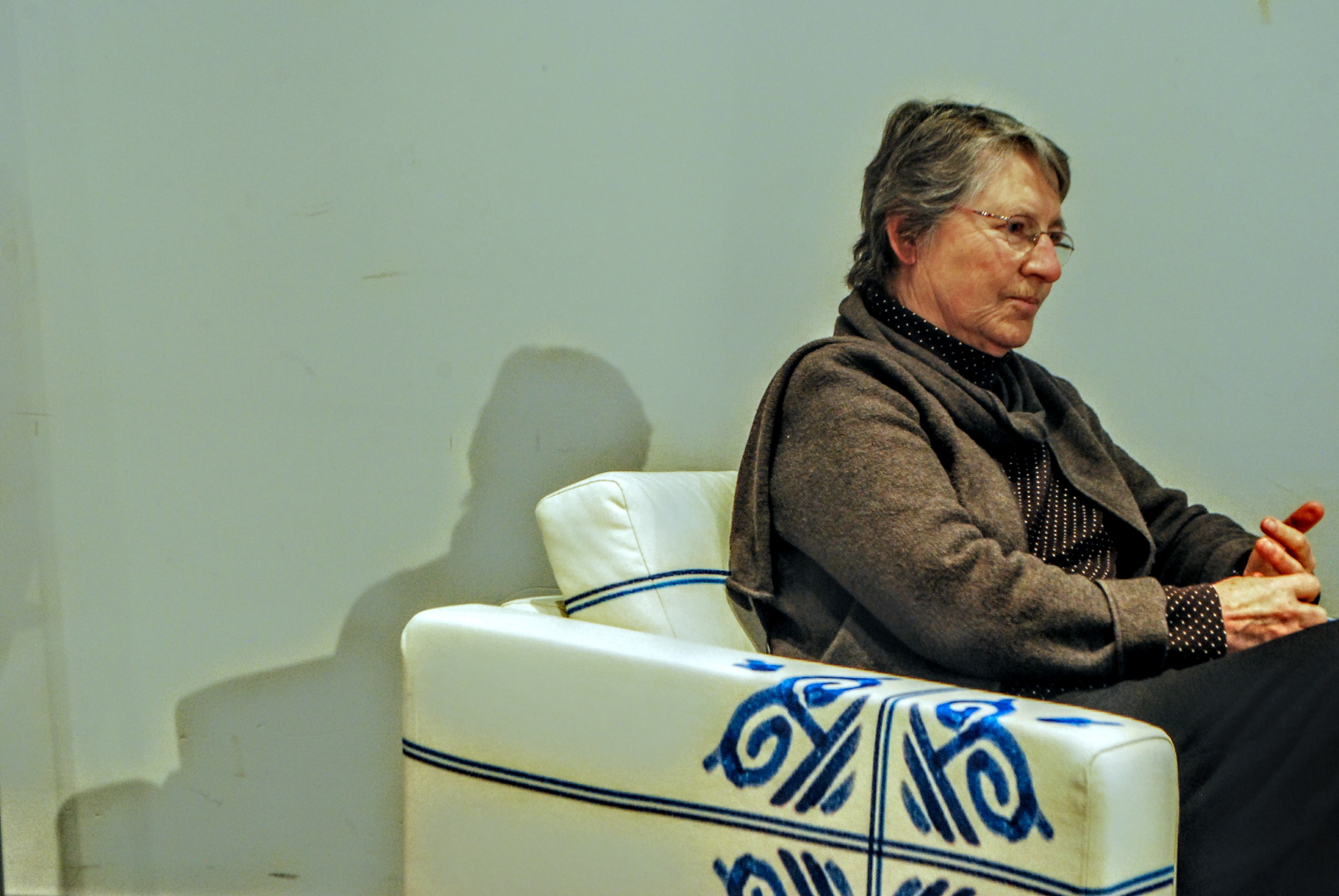
- Born: 1 January 1940; Loughborough, England
- Died: 7 March 2024 (aged 84)
- Scientific career
- Fields: Urban planning and Governance
- Workplaces: Newcastle University

Patsy Healey OBE FBA FAcSS (née Ingold; 1 January 1940 – 7 March 2024) was a British urban planner. She was professor emeritus at Global Urban Research Unit in the School of Architecture, Planning & Landscape, at Newcastle University. She was a specialist in planning theory and practice, with a particular focus on strategic spatial planning for city regions and in urban regeneration policies. She was Senior Editor of Planning Theory and Practice journal, jointly published by TandF and the RTPI.

She was the daughter of the mycologist Cecil T. Ingold.

== Research interests ==
She undertook research on the preparation and implementation of development plan frameworks, on how planning strategies work out in practice and on partnership forms of governance at the neighbourhood, city and city region scales. Over the years, she developed approaches to collaborative planning practices, linked to an institutionalist analysis of urban socio-spatial dynamics and urban governance, with books on urban governance and on strategic spatial planning in Europe.

== Honours ==
- In July 2009, she was awarded Ordinary Fellowship from the British Academy for distinction in Urban planning theory and practice.
- In October 2006, she received Royal Town Planning Institute’s (RTPI) Gold Medal Award on outstanding achievement in the field of town and country planning. Healey was the first woman ever to receive the award in its 53-year history.
- In June 2006, she was made a Fellow of University College, London.
- In 2004, she was recognised as an Honorary Member, by the Association of European Schools of Planning (AESOP), only the second such honour to be awarded.
- In 1999, she was awarded an OBE for services to planning.

== Memberships ==
- Founding Member of Planning, and Honorary Member from 2004
- Member of the ODPM/DCLG Planning Research Network, the Planning Aid Council, the RTPI’s Knowledge and Research Committee in the UK
- Member of the 2003 ICES-KIS Panel in the Netherlands.
- An adviser to the ODPM/DCLG’s Evaluation Study of the new Local Development Frameworks, (now Spatial Planning in Practice) from 2004
- Member of advisory panel for the ODPM on the evaluation of the Housing Market Renewal Pathfinder Programme
- Advisory board member of SITI, in Turin, Italy, and of CITTA, at the University of Porto, Portugal

== Publications ==
=== Books ===
- Urban Complexity and Spatial Strategies: a relational planning for our times, Routledge, London, 2006. ISBN 0-415-38034-0 (hardcover) and ISBN 0-415-38035-9 (paperback) (On experiences of strategic spatial planning in city regions, with indepth case studies in the UK, Italy and the Netherlands).
- Collaborative Planning: Shaping Places in Fragmented Societies, 2nd Edition, Palgrave Macmillan, 2005. ISBN 1-4039-4920-4

=== Journal articles ===
- Relational Complexity and the imaginative power of strategic spatial planning, European Planning Studies, 2006, Vol 14 (4), pp 525–246
- Transforming governance: challenges of institutional adaptation and a new politics of space, European Planning Studies, 2006, Vol 14 (3), pp. 299–319

=== Book chapters ===
- Territory, integration and spatial planning, in Tewdwr-Jones, M and Allmendinger P, Territory, Identity and Spatial Planning: spatial governance in a fragmented nation, 2006, London, Routledge, pp. 64–79
- Making Better Places (Planning, Environment, Cities) - The Planning Project in the Twenty-First Century, Palgrave Macmillan, May 2010, ISBN 9780230200579
- Communicative Planning: Practices, Concepts and Rhetorics in Sanyal, Bishwapriya, Vale, Lawrence J. and Rosan, Christina D., Planning Ideas that Matter: Livability, Territoriality, Governance, and Reflective Practice, 2012, Cambridge, MIT Press, pp. 333–358.

== See also ==
- Association of European Schools of Planning
- Global Urban Research Unit
