= Jean Hillier =

British town planner

- Born: Kent, England
- Scientific career
- Fields: Planning Theory and Environmental Humanities
- Workplaces: Professor Emerita RMIT UNiversity

Jean Hillier is Professor Emerita in the Centre for Urban Research at RMIT University, Melbourne, Australia.

== Research interests ==
Research interests include poststructural planning theory and methodology for strategic practice in conditions of uncertainty, more-than-human planning theory and practice, and problematisation of cultural heritage practices in spatial planning, particularly in China.

== Research projects ==
- ARC Large Grant. The Role of Procedural Justice in Determining the Effectiveness of Citizen Involvement in Planning.
- AHURI. Falling through the Net, A Risk Management Model for Home Ownership Support Schemes. (with Peter V., Walker R. & Berry M.)
- AHURI. The Impact of Urban Regeneration on Indigenous Households. (with Walker R.)
- EU FP6. Katarsis. (with Moulaert F.).
- EU FP7. Social Polis. (with Moulaert F.)
- ARC Discovery. Enabling social innovation for local climate adaptability (with Steele W., MacCallum D., Byrne J. and Houston D.)

== Publications ==
Over 200 publications in her name:

=== Books ===
2002 * Habitus: A Sense of Place, edited with Emma Rooksby, Ashgate, Aldershot

2002 * Shadows of Power: an Allegory of Prudence, Routledge, London.

2005 * Consent and Consensus, edited with Denis Cryle, API Network, Perth.

2007 * Stretching Beyond the Horizon: a multiplanar theory of spatial planning and governance, Ashgate, Aldershot.

2008 * Critical Essays in Planning Theory, 3 Volumes, edited with Patsy Healey, Ashgate, Aldershot.

2009 * Social Innovation and Territorial Development, edited with Frank Moulaert, Serena Vicari and Diana MacCallum, Ashgate, Aldershot.

2009 * Planning in 10 Words – Or Less, with Gunder M., Ashgate, Farnham.

2010 * The Ashgate Research Companion to Planning Theory: Conceptual Challenges for Spatial Planning, edited with Patsy Healey, Ashgate, Farnham.

2012 * Complexity and the Planning of the Built Environment, edited with Gert de Roo, Joris Van Wezemael, Ashgate, Farnham.

2014 * Gilles Deleuze and Félix Guattari for Planners, InPlanning e-book,

2015 * Connections: exploring contemporary planning theory and practice with Patsy Healey, edited with Jonathan Metzger, Ashgate, Farnham.

2017 * The Planning Theory Tradition: an international account, 规划理论传统：国际化解读, with Patsy Healey, Southeastern University Press, Nanjing, China 南京东南大学出版社有限公司 (In Mandarin).

2017 * Situated Practices of Strategic Planning: An international perspective, edited with Louis Albrechts and Alessandro Balducci, Routledge, Abingdon.

=== Selected journal articles ===
2020 * Towns within Towns: From incompossibility to inclusive disjunction in urban spatial planning, (with Metzger J.) Deleuze and Guattari Studies
