= Frank Moulaert =

- Born: 5 April 1951 (age 75); Bruges, Belgium
- Education: University of Pennsylvania
- Known for: Social Innovation and territorial development, Integrated Area Development
- Scientific career
- Fields: Social innovation, Urban and Regional Planning
- Workplaces: Katholieke Universiteit Leuven, Newcastle University
- Doctoral advisor: Walter Isard

Frank Moulaert is Professor of Spatial Planning at the Department of Architecture, Urban Design and Regional Planning at Catholic University of Leuven. He is Director of the Urban and Regional Planning Research Group and chairs the Leuven Space and Society Research Centre at the University. He is also a visiting professor at the School of Architecture, Planning and Landscape, Newcastle University.

Moulaert has initiated a number of research and development projects on social innovation in territorial development. He has extensively published on the subjects related to globalisation, Institutionalism, territorial innovation, social economy, social polarisation, social exclusion, integrated area development, regional development, European governance, and socioeconomic networking. Other areas of his interest include evolutionary theory and the ecology of nature parks. He is fluent in 6 European languages and have published a number of works in Dutch, English, French, German, Italian and Spanish language.

Most of his recent works reflect a growing focus on urban development as well as the institutional dynamics of social innovation and social exclusion implying the need to include the cultural dynamics, artistic activities, and social economy organizations and associations into the social policy and planning arena.

== Recent activities ==
- Coordinates European Spatial Development Planning Network
- Coordinates European Module in Spatial Development Planning (EMSDP)
- Coordinator for SOCIALPOLIS – Social Platform on Cities and Social Cohesion (2008-2010) in the area of urban development and cohesion, under FP7 (SOCIAL POLIS)
- Coordinator for Research Area [O] Economy, Society and Territory, European Association for Evolutionary and Political Economy (EAEPE)

== Biography ==
Moulaert graduated in Business Administration from the Universitaire Faculteiten Sint-Ignatius, Antwerp, Belgium in 1971. Subsequently, he studied for Masters in Economics at the Katholieke Universiteit, Leuven, Belgium (in 1974) and then in 1977 in Regional Science from University of Pennsylvania, Department of Regional Science. In 1979, he received PhD in Regional Science at University of Pennsylvania, Philadelphia, U.S.

He is married to Greet Debucquoy and has three children Pieter, Stijn, and Elke. When he is not travelling, he settles in his house in the small West Flanders' town of Kortrijk.

== Academic career ==
From time to time, between 1974 until 1983, Moulaert was engaged as Research and teaching assistant in regional economics, Centrum voor Economische Studiën at Katholieke Universiteit Leuven. In between, he also worked as Research and teaching assistant for Regional Science Department at University of Pennsylvania, and Peace Science Department. He was associate professor at Limburgse Economische Hogeschool, Diepenbeek.

=== At University of Lille I (USTL) ===
In 1987 he moved to Faculty of Economics and Sociology, Université des Sciences et Technologies de Lille, Lille, France as associate professor in Economics and remained Professor of Economics between 1994-2002. His other capacities at University of Lille I include:

- Prime d'encadrement et de recherché;
- Habilitation à diriger les recherches;
- Coordinator for ERASMUS Intensive Programmes "Lille-Roubaix-Tourcoing: a Metropolitan Region in the Central Periphery of the European Community"; Faculty coordinator for the ERASMUS networks "Spatial Development" and "Social-scientific Study of Technical Change and Innovation in a European Context";
- Head of International Ph.D. programme in Regional Development Planning;
- Vice-dean for International Relations;
- Head of the Bachelor's Programme in Industrial Economics;
- Head of the Master's Programme in Industrial and Labour Economics, and Regional Development Planning.

==== Positions held ====
- Associate Director of Johns Hopkins University Center for Urban and Regional Development, at Universite of Lille I (1984–87).
- Scientific advisor of the Ministry of Science in Belgium in 1989-90.
- Coordinated the international conference "Cities, Enterprises and Society on the Eve of the 21st Century" in Lille, March 1994.
- Curator, Bruges European Capital of Culture 2002, "Poverty, Culture and Urban Renaissance."
- Held three Marie Curie fellowships (1996, 1998, 2002).

=== At Newcastle University (2002–2007) ===
Between 2002 and 2007, he remained Professor of European Planning and Development at the School of Architecture, Planning and Landscape, Newcastle University, Newcastle upon Tyne, UK. He also led the research themes on Regeneration, Social Innovation and Inclusion at Global Urban Research Unit. Additionally, he held the positions of:

- Chair in European Planning and Development;
- Coordinator of Postgraduate Certificate in European Spatial Development Planning;
- Coordinator of Departmental ERASMUS exchanges;

=== At K.U.Leuven ===
Since 2007, he has been working at the Faculty of Engineering, Katholieke Universiteit Leuven in Belgium. He chairs the Leuven Space and Society Research Centre and is head of the Research Group on Urban and Regional Planning at the Department of Architecture, Urban Design and Regional Planning. He also coordinates the European Spatial Development Planning network.

== European social science research ==
Moulaert is an active figure in European Research Networking in social sciences. He is credited for having conducted 15% of all research projects in Social-science and Humanities for three European Commission Framework Projects (FP4, FP5, and FP6) combined. Among the many successful social science projects coordinated and steered by Moulaert, some include:

- Urban regeneration and social Polarisation in the City – URSPIC (1997–1999).
- Valorising Linkages between Private Consulting and Public Research and the Role of Universities – VALICORES (2001–2004)
- Social Innovation, Governance and Community Building – SINGOCOM (2001-2004)
- Development Models and Logics for Socioeconomic Organization in Space, an FP6 STReP with a consortium of 9 international institutions, DEMOLOGOS, (2004–07).
- Growing Inequality and Social Innovation: Alternative Knowledge and Practice in Overcoming Social Exclusion in Europe. A Coordination Action under European Commission Framework-6 (FP6), KATARSIS (2006–09).
- Leverhulme Trust Fellowship 2006–07 in Social Innovation strategy for scientific research and human development.
- Social Platform on Cities and Social Cohesion in the area of urban development and cohesion, under FP7, SOCIALPOLIS (2008-2010).

== Selected publications ==
=== Edited books ===
- Moulaert, F., Swyngedouw, E. and A. Rodriguez The Globalized City: Economic Restructuring and Social Polarization in European Cities. Oxford University Press, 2003, ISBN 978-0-19-926040-9
- Globalization and Integrated Area Development in European Cities. Oxford University Press, 2000, ISBN 0-19-924113-9 (Hardcover), 2002 ISBN 0-19-925770-1 (Paperback).
- MacCallum, D., Moulaert, F., Hillier, J. and S. Vicari Social Innovation and Territorial Development, Ashgate Publishing, 2009. ISBN 978-0-7546-7233-3
- Moulaert, F. and Vicari, S. (in Italian), Rigenerare la Città. Pratiche di innovazione sociale nelle città europee, Il Mulino, 2009.
- Moulaert, F., Swyngedouw, E., Martinelli, F. and S. Gonzalez, Can Neighbourhoods Save the City?: Community Development and Social Innovation, Routledge, 2010, ISBN 978-0-415-48588-3
- Oosterlynck, S., van den Broek, J., Albrechts, L., Moulaert, F. and A. Verhetsel, Bridging the Gap between Planning and Implementation: Turning Transformative Visions into Strategic Projects, Routledge. 2010, ISBN 978-0-415-56684-1

=== Special edited issues of journals ===
- (with Flavia Martinelli and Erik Swyngedouw) Social Innovation and Local Development. Special issue of Urban Studies, vol. 42, issue 11, October 2005.
- (with Flavia Martinelli and Erik Swyngedouw) Social innovation and Governance in European Cities: between path dependency and radical innovation. Special issue of European Urban and Research Studies, 2006.
- (with Abdel Hamdouch and Jacques Nussbaumer) Valorizing Linkages between Research Institutes in Europe. Special issue of The European Journal of Social Science Research, 2006.
- (with Serena Vicari) Ri-Generare la Citta. Pratiche di innovazione sociale nelle citta europee. Milano: Il Mulino. 2006. (in Italian)
- (with Jacques Nussbaumer) La logique sociale du developpement territorial. Projet soumis aux Presses de l'Universite du Quebec. 2006. (in French)

=== Articles in refereed journals ===
- Institutional Economics and Planning Theory: A Partnership between Ostriches? Planning Theory, 4(1): 21–32, 2005. see the abstract/article
- Farid Sekia; Territorial Innovation Models: a Critical Survey (2003). "Territorial Innovation Models: a Critical Survey". Regional Studies. 37 (3): 289–302.
- (with Jean Hillier and Jacques Nussbaumer) Three essays on the nature of social innovation in territorial development, Geographie, Economie, Societes, 6(2): 129–152, 2004. (in French). see the abstract/article
- (with Jacques Nussbaumer) The Social region. Beyond the learning economy. European Urban and Regional Studies, 12(1): 45–64, 2005. see the abstract/article
- (with Oana Ailenei) Social economy, Third Sector and Solidarity Relations: A Conceptual Synthesis from History to Present. Urban Studies, 42(11): 2037–2053, 2005. see the abstract/article
- (with Jacques Nussbaumer) Defining the Social Economy and its Governance at the Neighbourhood Level: a Methodological Reflection. Urban Studies, 42 (11): 2071–2088, 2005. see the abstract/article
- (with Flavia Martinelli, Erik Swyngedouw and Sara Gonzalez) Towards Alternative Model(s) of Local Innovation. Urban Studies, 42 (11): 1969–1990, 2005. see the abstract/article
- (with Kathy Cabaret), Planning, Networks and Power Relations: is Democratic Planning Under Capitalism Possible? Planning Theory, 5(1), 51–70, 2006. see the abstract/article

=== Chapters in books ===
- (with J. Nussbaumer), « Die Ökonomie der europäischen Großstadt », The economy of the large European city. The social nature of articulated productivity, in Siebel W. (ed.) Die Europaïsche Stadt. Berlin, Suhrkamp (in German), 2003.
- (with J. Nussbaumer), Regional Production and Reproduction : The social region, in S. Kesting, (ed.) Tagungsband der 10. Iiso-Fachtagung, Série « Institutionelle und Sozial-Ökonomie », Peter Lang Verlag, 2005
- (with J. Nussbaumer) Beyond the learning region: the dialectics of innovation and culture in territorial development" in: R. Kloosterman and R. Boschma eds. Learning from Clusters. A Critical Assessment from an Economic-Geographical Perspective. Dordrecht, Springer, 2005.

== See also ==
- EAEPE
- ESDP-Network
- Social exclusion
- Social innovation
