= Stuart Cameron (town planner) =

Stuart Cameron is Senior Lecturer at School of Architecture, Planning & Landscape, Newcastle University in the United Kingdom. He has been the first Director of Global Urban Research Unit.

A sociologist and town planner by background, his current research and publications are on area-based regeneration, urban regeneration, social exclusion and housing and the linkages between them. His current works focus on the housing systems, social inclusion, and implications of policies involving the physical restructuring of unpopular neighbourhoods with a European comparative element. Cameron is a member of the Royal Town Planning Institute.

== Early life ==
Cameron graduated with a Bachelor of Arts in Sociology from the University of Exeter.

== Research projects ==
- Studies of minority ethnic housing, housing association development in rural areas.
- Scoping report on social inclusion in the North East England.
- Regeneration research for the DETR and ODPM (now Department for Communities and Local Government) on Co-ordination of Area-based Initiatives.
- DEMOLOGOS Project on Development Models and Logics of Socioeconomic Organization
- KATARSIS Project on Growing Inequality and Social Innovation: Alternative Knowledge and Practice in Overcoming Social Exclusion in Europe.

== Prominent publications ==
- "From Low Demand to Rising Aspirations: Housing Market Renewal within Regional and Neighbourhood Regeneration Policy," Housing Studies, Vol. 21, No. 1, 3–16, January 2006.
- "Strategic partnerships and area-based initiatives; West Cumbria in comparative context" in R Wylie(ed): Governance in a Stakeholder Society, Whitehaven: Westlakes Research Institute. 2004.

== See also ==
- Global Urban Research Unit
- Social innovation
