= Association of European Schools of Planning =

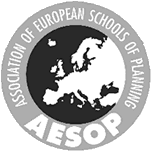
- Company type: Network of European universities
- Founded: 1987
- Headquarters: Dortmund, Germany
- Website: www.aesop-planning.eu

The Association of European Schools of Planning (AESOP) is a network of European universities, their departments and affiliated schools that are engaged in teaching and research in the fields of urban and regional planning.

== Foundation ==
The formal charter of the establishment of AESOP was signed in Dortmund, Germany, in 1987. In 1992, it was formally registered as a non-profit association under Belgian law.

== Aims ==
The association aims to promote the development of the teaching curricula and research among its member institutions through mutual dialogue, communication, exchange, and dissemination of research practices.

== Presidents and secretaries general ==
Presidents	Secretaries general
Maria Håkansson (since 2024)	Giancarlo Cotella (since 2023)
Thomas Dillinger (2022-2024)	Angelique Chettiparamb (2023)
Maroš Finka (2020-2022)	Angelique Chettiparamb (2020-2022)
Ben Davy (2018-2020)	Angelique Chettiparamb (2018-2020)
Anna Geppert (2016–2018)	Paulo Pinho (2015–2019)
Francesco Lo Piccolo (2014–2016)	Izabela Mironowicz (2011 – 2015)
Gert de Roo (2012–2014)	Anna Geppert (2007 – 2011)
Kristina L.Nilsson (2010 – 2012)	Gert de Roo (2002 – 2007)
Willem Salet (2008 – 2010)	Angela Hull (1998 – 2002)
Peter Ache (2006 – 2008)	Goran Cars (1995 – 1998)
Simin Davoudi (2004 –2006)	Myriam Jansen–Verbeke (1993 – 1995)
Alessandro Balducci (2002 – 2004)	Richard Williams (1991 – 1993)
Hans Mastop (2000 – 2002)	Anthony Ramsey (1989 – 1991)
Tadeusz Markowski (1998 – 2000)	David Massey (1987 – 1989)
Marcel Bazin (1996 – 1998)	
Patsy Healey (1994 – 1996)	
Giorgio Piccinato (1992 – 1994)	
Louis Albrecht (1990 – 1992)	
Klaus Kunzmann (1987 – 1990)	

== See also ==
- European Spatial Development Perspective
- European Union
- The European Spatial Development Planning network
