= European Spatial Development Planning =

European Spatial Development Planning Network
- Type: Network of European universities
- Founded: 1987
- Founder: Louis Albrechts
- Headquarters: Leuven, Belgium
- Area served: Spatial development and planning, Town planning
- Key people: Frank Moulaert, Flavia Martinelli, Arantxa Rodriguez, AbdelIllah Hamdouch
- Website: https://esdp-network.net/

The European Spatial Development Planning or ESDP-Network seeks to promote education, research and professional training in spatial planning across European countries, in collaboration with many partners in other regions of the world. To this purpose it considers planning as a process and a change agenda.

Presently coordinated by Frank Moulaert at Global Urban Research Unit, Newcastle University, the network coordinates a number of student and staff mobility programmes involving various partner institutions in a number of European countries. The existing structure is a merger of the Spatial Development Planning network established by Louis Albrechts at the University of Leuven, Belgium in 1987 and that built around the European Town planning by Richard Williams at Newcastle University in the 1990s. The overlaps between both networks shows a natural basis for their integration.

== Aims and objectives ==
The basic aims of the network revolve around the need to promote the Planning practices across Europe, interdisciplinary interactions, and identification of successful planning experiences.

Three kinds of staff and students exchanges are supported under the banner of the network:

- General ERASMUS programme mobility;
- Short Intensive Programmes; and,
- a comprehensive Postgraduate Certificate in European Spatial Development and Planning.

Apart from this the network scholars are also engaged in wider interdisciplinary research through various programmes funded by European Commission and respective national institutions.

The network also holds regular scholarly events that generally address the evolution of planning aspects since the inception of the network.

== Participating institutions ==
Belgium:

- Katholieke Universiteit Leuven, Leuven

France:

- University of Lille, Lille
- François Rabelais University, Tours

Germany:

- University of Bremen, Bremen

Greece:

- Harokopio University, Athens

Italy:

- Università degli Studi di Milano-Bicocca, Milan
- Università Mediterranea di Reggio Calabria, Reggio Calabria
- Politecnico di Torino, Turin
- Università di Roma La Sapienza, Rome
- Università degli Studi di Napoli Fredrico-II, Naples

Portugal:

- University of Aveiro, Aveiro

Slovakia:

- Slovenská technická univerzita v Bratislave, Bratislava

Spain:

- University of the Basque Country, Bilbao

Sweden:

- KTH Royal Institute of Technology, Stockholm
- Blekinge Tekniska Högskola, Blekinge

Turkey:

- Middle East Technical University, Ankara

United Kingdom:

- University of Newcastle upon Tyne, Newcastle upon Tyne, England
- Cardiff University, Wales

== See also ==
- Global Urban Research Unit
- ESPRID
