= Regional development =

Developing a less economically developed place

Regional development refers to a broad category of policies aimed at reducing regional disparities within an economy or across economies by devoting resources to underdeveloped areas. Regional development can be national or international in nature. Therefore, the implications and scope of regional development may vary according to the definition of a region and how the region and its boundaries are perceived internally and externally.

In the past, regional development tended to center mostly on inward investment within national economies (OECD,2020). In recent decades, however, regional development has taken on an increasingly international character. For example, organizations such as the OECD, UN, and IMF have stepped up various forms of economic assistance to less developed regions.

== By country ==
=== Canada ===
- Atlantic Canada Opportunities Agency
- Economic Development Agency of Canada for the Regions of Quebec
- Federal Economic Development Initiative for Northern Ontario
- Western Economic Diversification Canada

=== Finland ===
- Centre for Economic Development, Transport and the Environment
- Regional State Administrative Agency

=== Malaysia ===
- Central Terengganu Development Authority, or Lembaga Kemajuan Terengganu Tengah (KETENGAH) – official website
- Kedah Regional Development Authority, or Lembaga Kemajuan Wilayah Kedah (KEDA) – official website
- South East Johore Development Authority, or Lembaga Kemajuan Johor Tenggara (KEJORA) – official website
- South Kelantan Development Authority, or Lembaga Kemajuan Kelantan Selatan (KESEDAR) – official website

=== Nigeria ===
- AREWA Center for Regional Development (ACRD) – official website

=== United Kingdom ===
- Regional Development has been an explicit concern of UK policy makers since at least the 1970s.
- It currently falls under the auspices of the Regional development agency.

=== United States ===
- Mid-Ohio Regional Planning Commission
- Tennessee Valley Authority

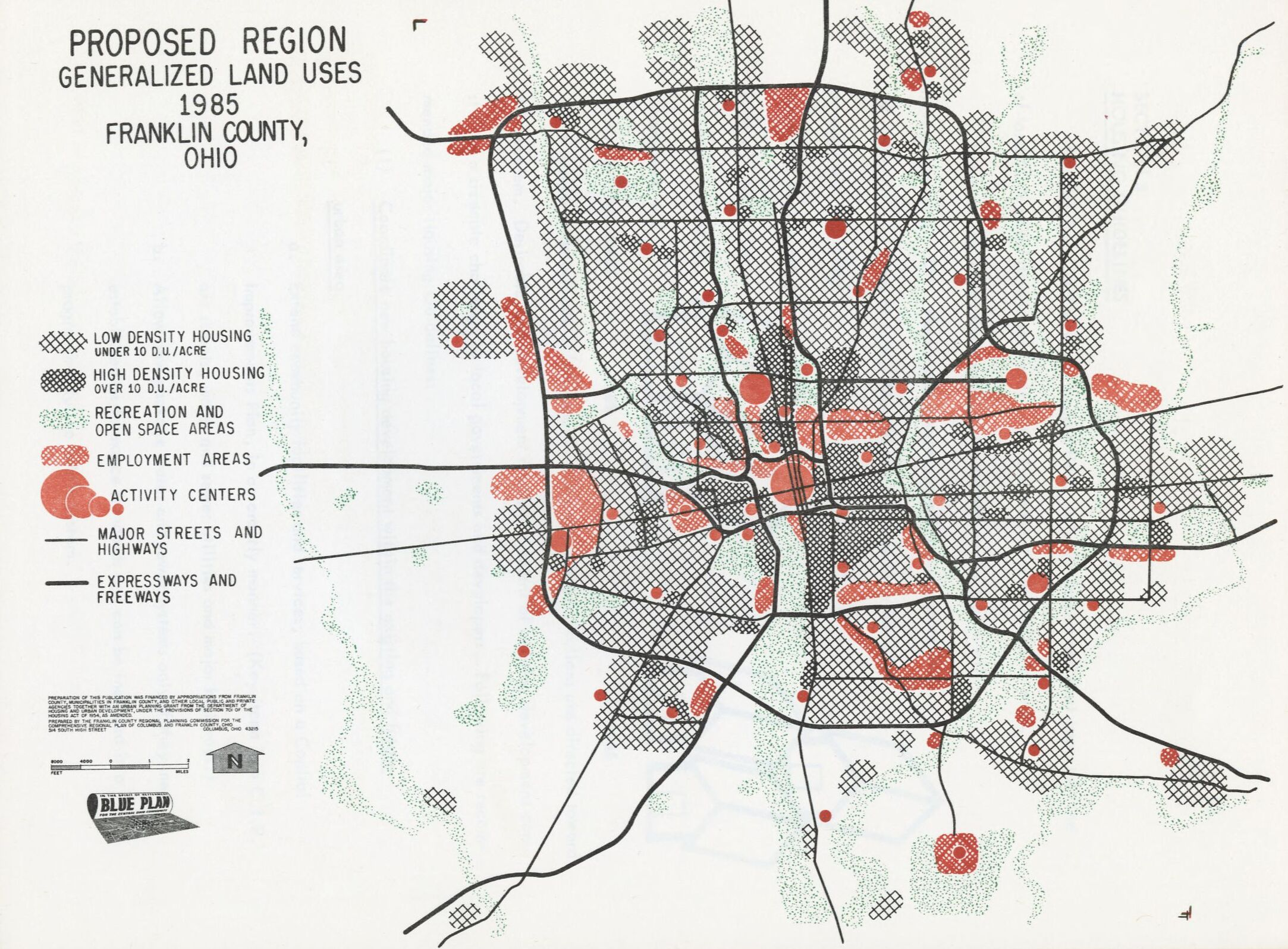
Proposed region - 1985 - Franklin County, Ohio

== See also ==
- Aid
- Development aid
- International development
- Regional science
- Regional Studies Association
- The Globalized City

Research projects

- DEMOLOGOS
- URSPIC

== Regional Development organizations ==
- OECD What is Regional Development?
- ACRD Nigeria – AREWA Center for Regional Development
- European Inforegio Commission's Regional Policy Information
- IEDC Indiana Economic Development Corporation
- OECD Regional Competitiveness and Governance Division
- SWIEDC Southwest Indiana Economic Development Coalition
- UNCRD United Nations Centre for Regional Development
