= Sunnyside Gardens, Queens =

Historic district and planned community in Queens, New York

- Sunnyside Gardens Historic District
- U.S. National Register of Historic Places
- U.S. Historic district
- New York State Register of Historic Places
- New York City Landmark
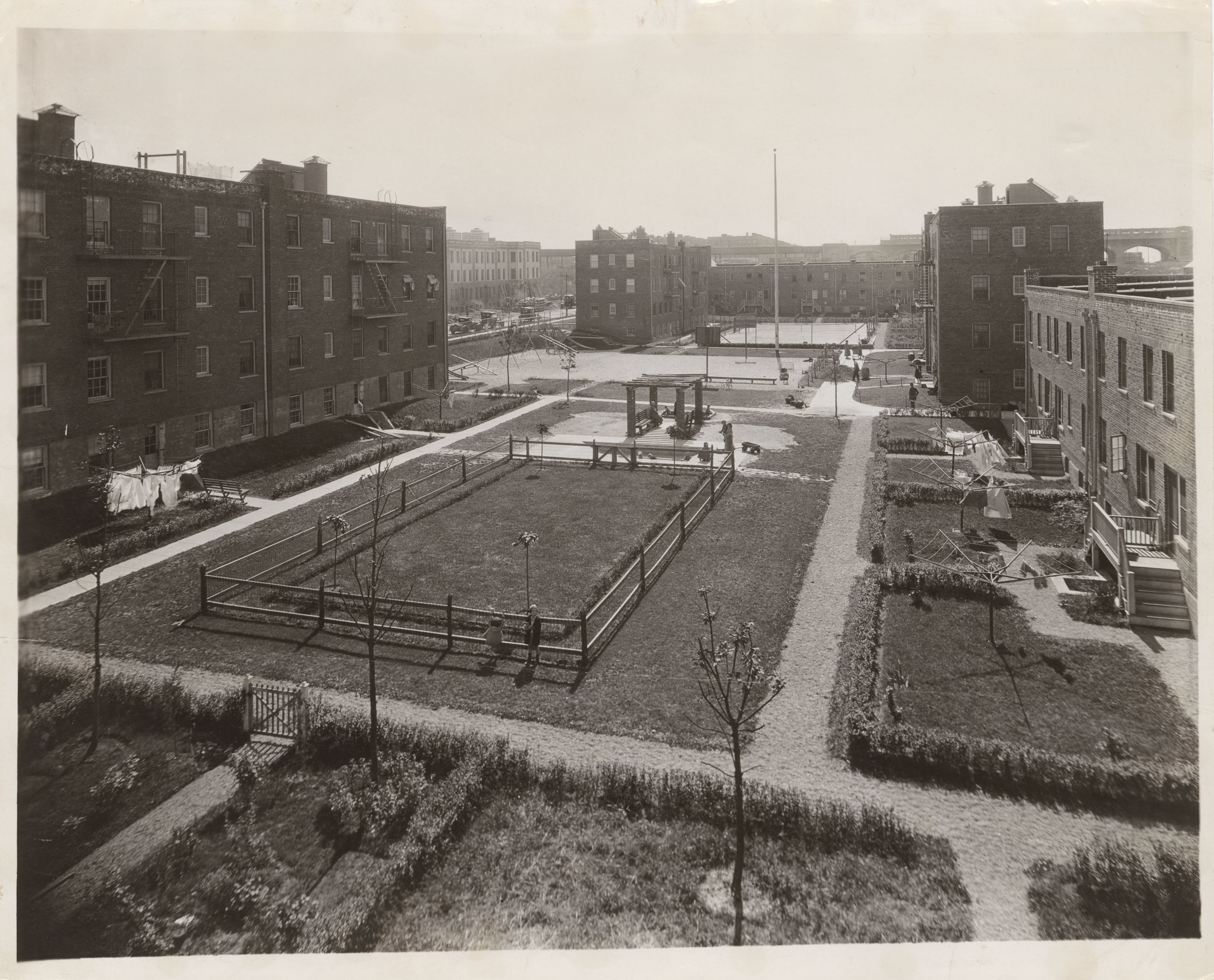
- A shared interior garden court in 1924, soon after the first phase of construction
- Location in New York City
- Location: Roughly bounded by Skillman Avenue, Barnett Avenue, 43rd Street, and 52nd Street, Queens, New York City
- Coordinates: 40°44′49″N 73°55′3″W
- Area: 53 acres (21 ha) (NRHP/NYSRHP); 77 acres (31 ha) (NYC Landmark)
- Built: 1924–1928
- Architects: Clarence Stein; Henry Wright; Frederick L. Ackerman
- Architectural style: Colonial Revival; vernacular brick row house
- NRHP reference No.: 84002919
- NYCL No.: 2258

Significant dates
- Added to NRHP: September 7, 1984
- Designated NYSRHP: August 3, 1984
- Designated NYCL: June 26, 2007

Sunnyside Gardens is a planned residential community and historic district in the Sunnyside neighborhood of the borough of Queens in New York City. Built between 1924 and 1928 by the City Housing Corporation, a limited-dividend company led by developer Alexander Bing, the 77-acre (31 ha) development was the first attempt to create a garden city in the United States, applying the planning principles of the English garden city movement of Ebenezer Howard and Raymond Unwin. It was conceived as the first built community of the Regional Planning Association of America (RPAA), a circle of architects, planners, and social critics whose founding members included Clarence Stein, Henry Wright, and Lewis Mumford.

The principal architects, Clarence Stein and Henry Wright, treated each block as a single planning unit rather than the lot-by-lot subdivision typical of New York row-house development. They arranged two-story brick rows around landscaped common courts at the interior of each block. Buildings cover only 28 percent of the land, and the common interior courts alone total nearly six acres of shared open space. Frederick L. Ackerman designed many of the individual houses, and Marjorie Sewell Cautley served as the development's landscape architect. The use of the courts was protected by 40-year easements administered by court-level trustees, an unusual legal instrument drafted by City Housing Corporation general counsel Charles S. Ascher. The City Housing Corporation also reserved roughly three acres at the eastern edge of the site for Sunnyside Gardens Park, the largest privately held park in New York City and one of only two members-only parks in the city, the other being Gramercy Park.

More than half of Sunnyside Gardens homeowners lost their houses to foreclosure during the Great Depression. A coordinated mortgage strike, led by the resident-run Consolidated Home Owners Mortgage Committee, secured only partial concessions from second-mortgage bondholders. The 40-year easements protecting the common courts began to expire in 1965 and 1966, prompting a decade of disputes over fences, driveways, and additions. In response, in 1974 the New York City Planning Commission and Board of Estimate designated Sunnyside Gardens one of the city's first four Special Planned Community Preservation Districts, a zoning tool intended to preserve the original site plan.

The historic district was listed on the National Register of Historic Places in 1984 and, after a contentious campaign led by the Sunnyside Gardens Preservation Alliance, was designated a New York City Historic District by the Landmarks Preservation Commission on June 26, 2007. The district encompasses more than 600 buildings on all or part of 16 city blocks, including 12 named courts and the Phipps Garden Apartments, a pair of Stein-designed apartment complexes built for the Society of Phipps Houses in 1931–1932 and 1935. Stein and Wright extended the Sunnyside Gardens approach in their later projects at Radburn, New Jersey and Chatham Village in Pittsburgh, and its planning ideas were carried forward in the New Deal greenbelt towns of the 1930s. The architectural critic Ada Louise Huxtable called the development "an example of simple, physical planning ... a social dream based purely on those physical arrangements, with their bonuses of light, air, open space and greenery."

== Geography ==
Sunnyside Gardens occupies most of 16 blocks in the northeastern part of Sunnyside, Queens, bounded roughly by Skillman Avenue on the south, Barnett Avenue on the north, 43rd Street on the west, and 52nd Street on the east. Within the borough as a whole, the district lies in northwestern Queens, about three miles east of the Queensboro Bridge. Several of the district's streets carried different names before the 1920s renaming of Queens addresses: 39th Avenue, which bisects the district, was Middleburg Avenue; 47th Street was Carolin Street; and 43rd Street was Laurel Hill Avenue.

The site sits between Queens Boulevard to the south and the Sunnyside Yard, the Pennsylvania Railroad's 192-acre coach yard, to the north. The 7 train of the New York City Subway runs along Queens Boulevard and along Roosevelt Avenue a few blocks south of the site, with the nearest station at 46th Street–Bliss Street. The station, opened in 1917 as part of the IRT Flushing Line's elevated extension into Queens, gave the site quick subway access to Manhattan, and the company marketed the development in the 1920s as a 15-minute subway ride from Grand Central. Two Phipps Garden Apartments complexes occupy the northeastern corner of the district, between 50th and 52nd Streets along 39th Avenue.

== History ==
=== Pre-development land use ===
In the colonial era the area that became Sunnyside Gardens was farmland, including an eighteenth-century farm on the sunny western slope of a hill near present-day Skillman Avenue, from which the neighborhood takes its name. The Bragaw family was among the area's early settler landowners. Beginning in 1902 the Long Island Rail Road and the Pennsylvania Railroad acquired and graded much of the surrounding land to build Sunnyside Yard; Sunnyside Hill was levelled to fill the wetlands and colonial-era farmhouses were demolished over local protest. The opening of the Queensboro Bridge in 1909, the Long Island Rail Road tunnels in 1910, and the extension of the elevated IRT Flushing Line into Queens (Alburtis Avenue/Corona in 1917) brought rapid transit to within walking distance of the future Sunnyside Gardens site.

By the early 1920s much of Sunnyside south of Queens Boulevard had been developed with new residential construction, spurred by a state-authorized municipal tax exemption for new dwellings adopted by the city in 1921. North of Queens Boulevard, however, the Long Island Rail Road still owned several hundred unimproved lots adjacent to its Sunnyside Yard.

=== Background: the garden city movement and the RPAA ===
The architectural and social ideas that shaped Sunnyside Gardens originated in the English garden city movement launched by Ebenezer Howard's 1898 book To-morrow: A Peaceful Path to Real Reform. Howard proposed self-contained, low-density satellite cities surrounded by agricultural green belts and linked by rail. Howard's theories were translated into built form by architects Raymond Unwin and Barry Parker at Letchworth Garden City (1903) and later at Hampstead Garden Suburb. Unwin's 1912 pamphlet Nothing Gained by Overcrowding argued that lower-density planning could deliver returns to investors equal to those of higher densities while producing more open space; the LPC designation report credits Unwin with "the greatest single influence in shaping the [Regional Planning Association of America]'s thinking on the economics and site-planning of residential neighborhoods."

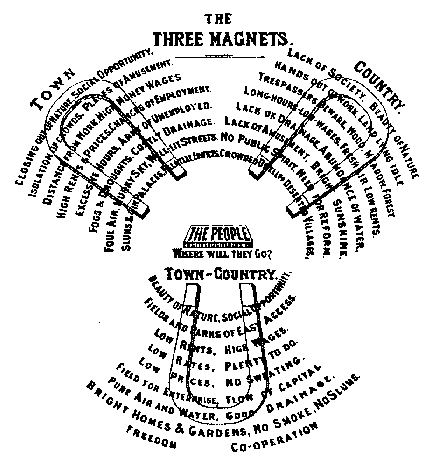
Ebenezer Howard's "Three Magnets" diagram (1898), the foundational garden city concept that inspired the City Housing Corporation

In April 1923 a group of architects, planners, economists, conservationists, and social critics met in New York to form the Regional Planning Association of America (RPAA, not to be confused with the unrelated Regional Plan Association). Founding members included Clarence Stein, Henry Wright, Benton MacKaye, Lewis Mumford, Frederick L. Ackerman, Robert D. Kohn, Stuart Chase, and the developer Alexander Bing. The housing economist Edith Elmer Wood, landscape architect Marjorie Sewell Cautley, and Catherine Bauer joined the group later, with Bauer serving as the RPAA's executive secretary. In 1924 Stein and Wright traveled to England, where they met Howard and Unwin and toured Letchworth, returning convinced that a similar community could be built in metropolitan New York.

=== City Housing Corporation ===
To provide a vehicle for the RPAA's housing ideas, Alexander Bing organized the City Housing Corporation (CHC), incorporated in March 1924 as a limited-dividend company with returns to investors capped by charter at six percent. CHC's stated purposes were to "develop better plans and methods for home and community building ... build the type of low-priced houses that are needed by self-respecting citizens in New York ... [and] encourage and develop cooperative methods of home ownership." Its long-term goal, articulated by Bing, was to build "a garden city along the lines of the English towns of Welwyn and Letchworth," using "the work of building and selling houses as a laboratory to work out better house and block plans, and better methods of construction and financing."

The corporation was capitalized at a planned $5 million in $100 shares; by mid-1926 subscribed capital reached approximately $1.75 million among about 300 stockholders. Officers and directors served without compensation. The 1924 board included Bing as president; his brother Leo S. Bing of Bing & Bing; the philosopher Felix Adler, founder of the Society for Ethical Culture and a member of the New York State Tenement House Commission; the economist Richard T. Ely of the Institute for Research in Land Economics and Public Utilities; the lawyer John G. Agar; the banker Arthur Lehman of Lehman Brothers; the state senator Thomas C. Desmond; the civic activist Mrs. Joseph M. Proskauer; and Eleanor Roosevelt. William Sloane Coffin Sr. served as vice-president, with Douglas Elliman, Charles S. Bird Jr., and V. Everit Macy also on the board. Stein, Wright, Ackerman, and Mumford were affiliated with the project through the RPAA rather than as CHC directors; Stein, Wright, and Ackerman were the corporation's contracted architects, and Mumford, who lived in the development from 1925 to 1936, was associated with CHC through the RPAA. Although prominent New York real-estate figures invested, the LPC report notes that the directors "all received a 6% return on their investments" only "for many years (until the Depression)."

In February 1924 CHC purchased about 76.7 acres of land north of Queens Boulevard, most of it from the Long Island Rail Road and a smaller fraction from neighboring private owners. Bing wrote in 1926 that "it was realized that the development of the larger tract would inevitably mean an enhancement of value of all the surrounding land, and the principle of excess condemnation was applied in the purchase of the adjacent land." Studying the corporation's land accounts, the economist Rosalind Tough found that of its 76.67-acre purchase the company resold about 21 acres as vacant lots at a large profit (roughly $1.62 a square foot, against production costs near 15 cents), a return that helped finance its next project at Radburn, New Jersey.

=== Planning and design ===
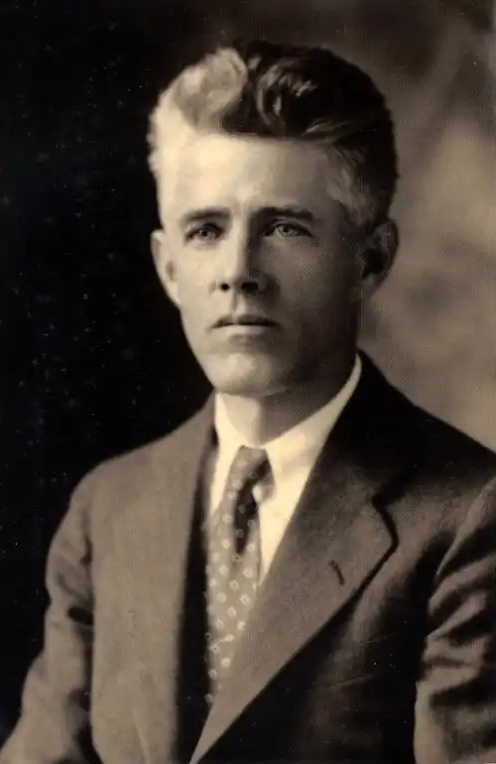
Henry Wright, c. 1920, co-planner of Sunnyside Gardens with Clarence Stein

First development plan for Sunnyside Gardens by Clarence Stein and Henry Wright, 1924, showing the perimeter blocks with shared interior courts.

Stein and Wright led the design, with Frederick Ackerman responsible for the individual house designs and Marjorie Sewell Cautley as landscape architect. The principal design constraint was imposed by the Queens borough engineer, who would not permit the closing of city streets: Stein and Wright had hoped to consolidate two or more blocks into a single superblock of the kind Unwin had used at Hampstead Garden Suburb, but were obliged to retain the existing grid. They responded by eliminating interior lot lines on each block and treating entire city blocks as their unit of planning. Houses were drawn close to the street in continuous brick rows, set in shallow front gardens and varied setbacks, with private rear yards of about 400 to 500 square feet (37 to 46 m^{2}) and a much larger landscaped common court in the interior of each block. Garages were not built next to individual homes; they were grouped at the edges of the development, and the CHC easements explicitly prohibited "garage of any kind or nature."

Richard T. Ely reported in 1926 that the houses covered only about 28 percent of the land at Sunnyside, "whereas other developments even of the better sort in the neighborhood frequently cover approximately 50%." Roughly 72 percent of the site was thus left open; the common interior courts accounted for nearly six acres of that open space, alongside the larger community park reserved at the development's eastern edge.

=== Construction, 1924–1928 ===
Construction began in March 1924 on the development's first block, Colonial Court, on the south side of the tract near Skillman Avenue between 47th and 48th Streets. By September 1924 the first unit, comprising 54 buildings (40 two-family houses, 8 one-family houses, and 6 six- and seven-family cooperative apartment buildings) housing approximately 128 families, was nearing completion. The first cooperative apartments, organized as the Sunnyside First Cooperative Housing Association under Article 12 of New York's Stock Corporation Law (later Article 7 of the Cooperative Corporation Law), were placed on sale in October 1924; "tenant-owners" acquired shares of cooperative stock and a 99-year proprietary lease.

A second unit centered on Hamilton Court began construction in spring 1925 and housed 225 additional families, and a third followed in 1926 with provision for 299 families. CHC adopted an unusual policy of continuous year-round construction; its real-estate manager Herbert Emmerich told the Brooklyn Citizen that "work can progress just as rapidly and efficiently in the colder weather" and that the corporation had built approximately $2 million worth of houses across two square blocks in the winter of 1925–1926 alone. Construction proceeded block by block from Colonial Court in 1924 northeastward toward Wilson Court Apartments in 1928, with twelve named courts completed in roughly chronological order. By the fall of 1928 CHC deemed Sunnyside Gardens substantially complete; it had provided housing for more than 1,200 families across more than 600 buildings.

A six-room single-family house was priced at $8,830 in 1926; an "all-in-one" monthly payment of $66.78 covered interest, taxes, insurance, and mortgage installments on a 22-year amortization plan, with a 10 percent down payment. A four-room cooperative apartment sold for $4,800 (with a $480 cash payment); a 12-room three-family house for $17,500. CHC sold first mortgages to a trust company and provided lender guarantees, allowing buyers with little established credit to qualify; the LPC report observes that this guarantee model "was a precursor of the Federal Housing Act of 1934 and the VA insured mortgage programs after World War II."

A 1928 CHC survey of 504 homeowners, representing nearly half of the community, found 184 blue-collar workers (including 116 mechanics, 50 chauffeurs, and 18 restaurant workers) and 355 white-collar workers (including 99 professionals such as teachers, social workers, lawyers and doctors; 79 office workers; 55 small tradesmen; 49 salesmen; and 35 government employees). (Note: The occupational subcategories itemized by Havelick and Kwartler are illustrative rather than exhaustive; the listed white-collar groups do not sum to the reported white-collar total.) A May 1927 New York Times real-estate column reported on an internal CHC survey of 277 recent buyers showing that 130, or roughly 47 percent, had moved from Manhattan, with the largest group coming from the East Side and additional contributions from the Lower East Side and the Lower West Side, followed by other parts of Queens, then the Bronx, and then Brooklyn; the company saw in the figures evidence that Manhattan was "sending forth a tide of home-seeking families with moderate means." A separate survey reported by Havelick and Kwartler found that roughly half of the first residents had come from tenements on the East Side of Manhattan. Of the original purchasers in the first unit, 55 of 73 had reported annual incomes between $1,200 and $3,500. The economic mixture extended to individual blocks: the architectural historian Christopher Gray later wrote that on 47th Street, "a hospital porter lived next to a professor, who lived next to a construction foreman, who lived next to a lawyer, who lived next to a coffee-house waiter." Although CHC did not exclude prospective buyers by race, the LPC report observes that early residents appear not to have included African Americans.

=== Phipps Garden Apartments, 1931–1935 ===
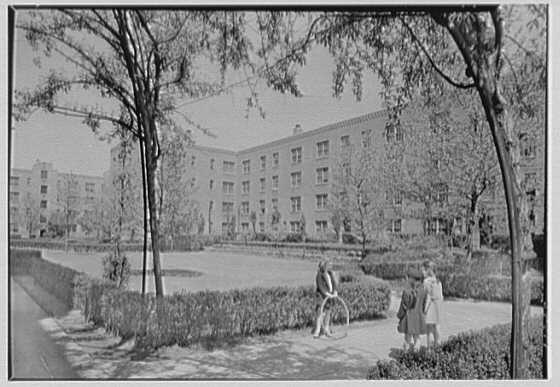
The interior courtyard of the Phipps Garden Apartments, photographed in 1940 by Samuel Gottscho for the Library of Congress

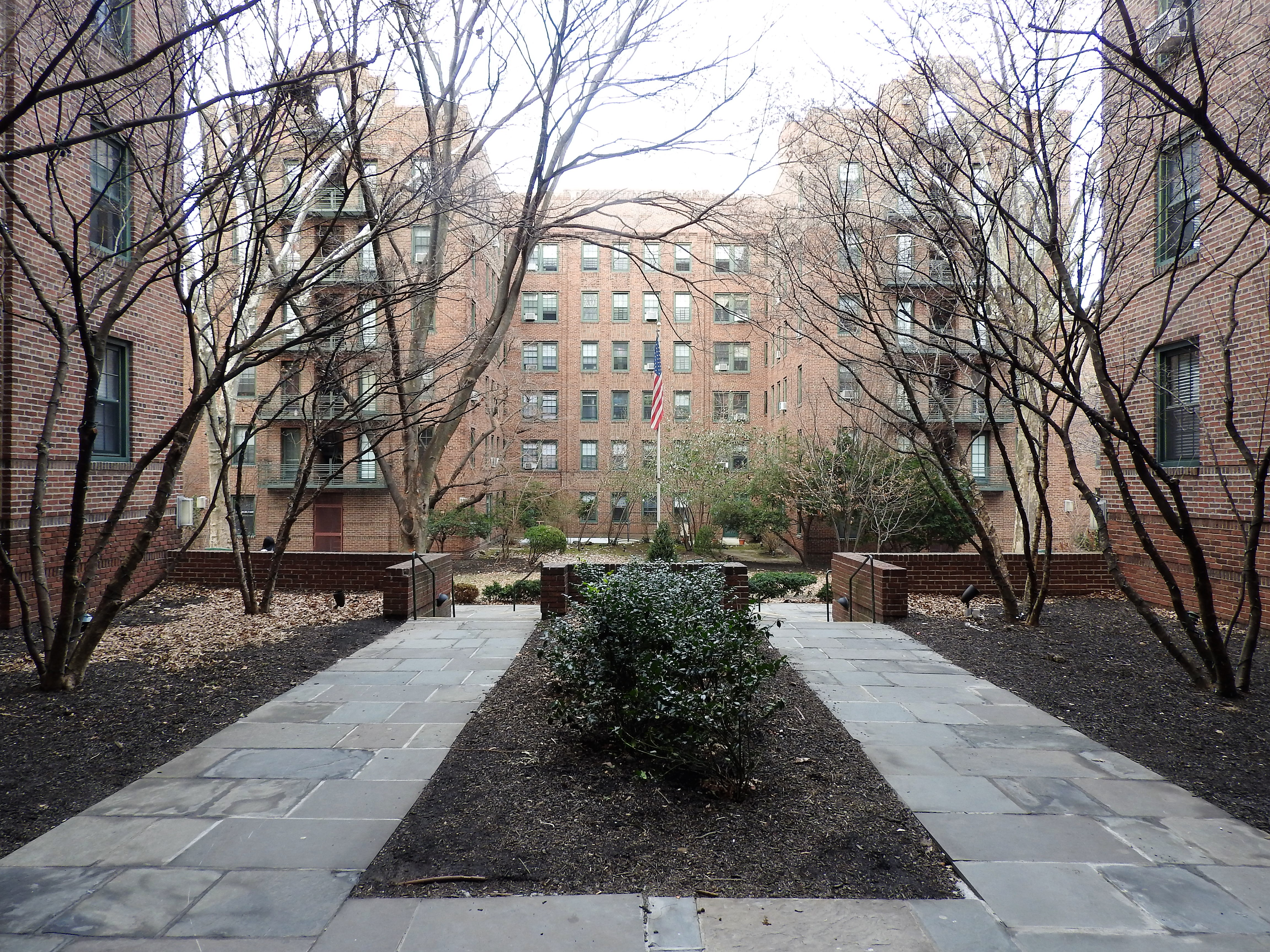
Central garden at the Phipps Garden Apartments (1931), designed by Clarence Stein with Isadore Rosenfield of his office, and landscaped by Marjorie Sewell Cautley

With Sunnyside Gardens substantially complete, CHC sold a tract at the northeastern corner of the original site, between 50th and 52nd Streets, to the Society of Phipps Houses, a model-tenement philanthropy founded by the steel magnate Henry Phipps Jr. Phipps engaged Stein to design what became the Phipps Garden Apartments, constructed in two campaigns in 1931–1932 and 1935. Because Phipps was able to close 51st Street between 39th Avenue and Barnett Avenue, Stein could plan the apartments on the kind of superblock that the Queens borough engineer had denied him at Sunnyside Gardens.

The first complex (1931–1932) consisted of six elevatored six-story units and sixteen four-story walk-up units, joined in a hollow square around an interior courtyard and accommodating 344 families. Isadore Rosenfield, an architect in Stein's office, explained that the projecting wings of the taller buildings gave the large interior court visual interest and kept it from appearing monotonous. The Phipps family donated six full-grown elm trees to the courtyard. The second complex (1935) extended the design north toward Barnett Avenue with a half-square plan. Marjorie Cautley supplied the planting plan for both courtyards. Original rents in 1931 ranged from $31 to $80 a month. Stein used face brick of varied colors and a stripped, geometric facade vocabulary that the LPC report places "even closer in design to the modern housing complexes built in Europe in the 1910s and 20s, particularly in Germany and the Netherlands, than had been seen on Stein's earlier buildings at Sunnyside." Together the two campaigns totaled about 472 apartments; by the early 1980s the complex was operated by a nonprofit corporation, with the lowest rents around $200 a month and a waiting list of as long as seven years.

=== Community life ===
The City Housing Corporation organized civic associations from the outset. A first-unit Sunnyside Neighborhood Association was formed within months of the first 1924 occupancies but soon disbanded amid internal dissension. A parallel second-unit association then opened its membership to all Sunnyside residents in 1925, and by 1926 had been formally constituted as the Sunnyside Gardens Civic Association, also referred to in contemporary press as the Sunnyside Gardens Community Association. Alongside it, a property-owners' association functioned within each square block to elect the trustees who managed the common courts. The New York Public Library placed a small branch collection in the community rooms of the second cooperative apartment group, and residents organized social clubs and a log-cabin theater in the community park.

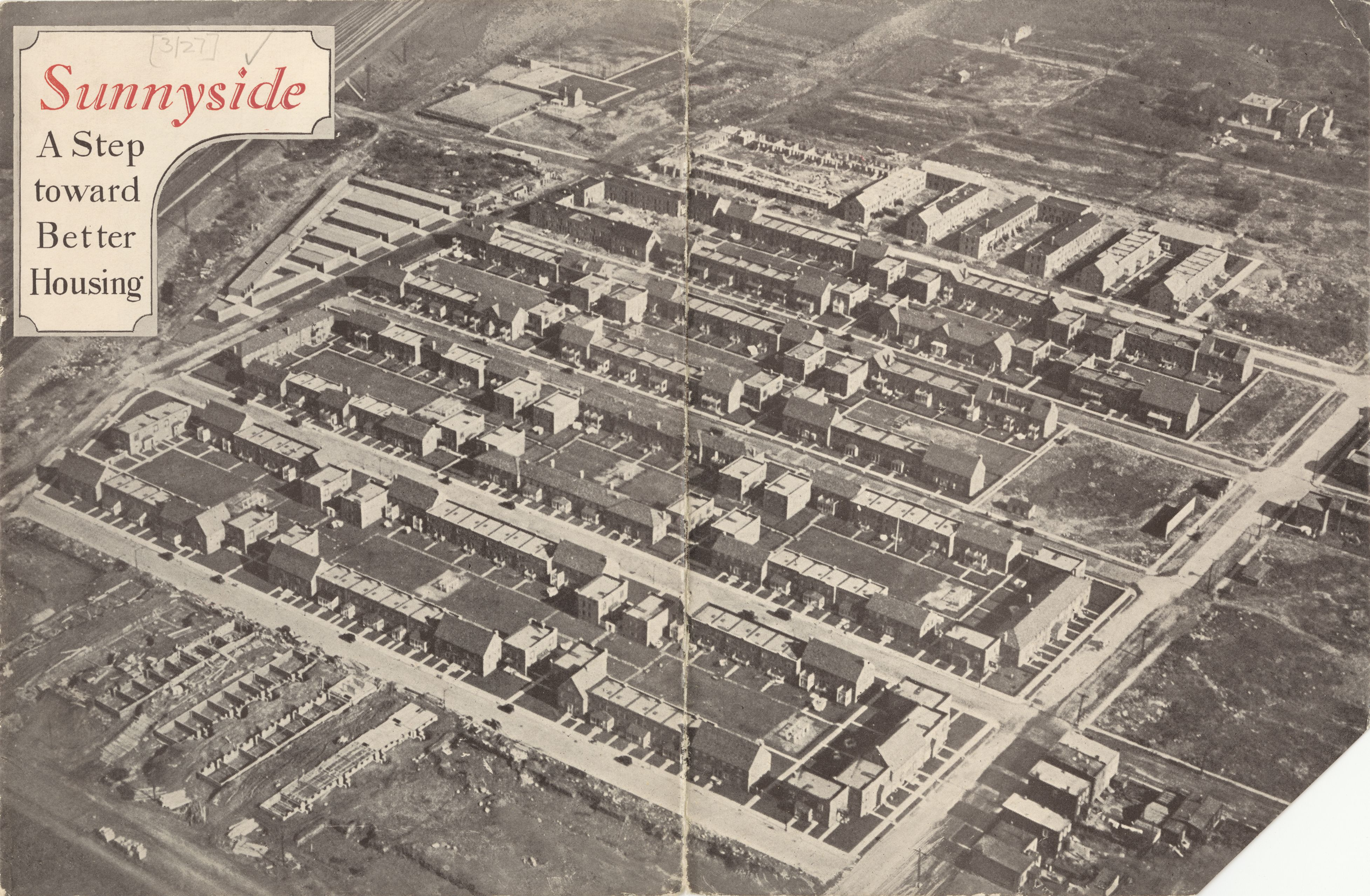
The cover of the City Housing Corporation's 1927 promotional brochure Sunnyside: A Step toward Better Housing, showing the development from the air.

CHC began marketing the development in The New Republic as early as September 1925, framing its cooperative apartments as organized on "Rochdale cooperative principles" and aimed at "professional people, teachers and writers." A 1930 advertisement in the same magazine described the development as housing "intelligent, educated, professional people" and noted that "Sunnyside Gardens is only 15 minutes from Grand Central by subway, and has its own progressive school, as well as many after-school supervised recreation groups in a private park." The same magazine's columnist Bruce Bliven compared the development's interior commons to the green of a New England village.

Lewis Mumford lived at Sunnyside Gardens from 1925 to 1936, at 40-02 44th Street according to the LPC inventory. In his 1947 book Green Memories, he wrote of the community's "space, sunlight, order [and] color" and remembered its plane trees and poplars and the "friendly air" of the common gardens. In December 2004 a National Register plaque was unveiled at Mumford's longtime address. His grandson James Morss unveiled the plaque, and the Columbia urban historian Casey Blake and National Trust for Historic Preservation president Richard Moe provided remarks.

The community's homeowners came to include Irish-, German-, and Jewish-American working- and middle-class families. The community also had organized left-wing politics. In July 1929 a Socialist Party branch in Sunnyside, drawing from a development of about 1,200 families, sent $139 to the British Labour Party's campaign fund and invited Prime Minister Ramsay MacDonald to visit during his proposed United States tour. The branch called Sunnyside Gardens "a model community of working-class homes" only "twenty minutes by rapid transit from the heart of New York City."

CHC reported peak occupancy in fall 1930. The company's sales manager C. V. McLaughlin said that all 322 apartments in CHC-owned apartment buildings were rented, with 85 percent of leases signed for three years under a sliding-scale rent policy designed to reward longer commitments. In June 1930, Bing announced a $50,000 endowment fund for Sunnyside Gardens, conveyed to the Community Trust of New York under provisions allowing its income to be used for park maintenance or other community projects. Bing told reporters the gift reflected CHC's policy of returning to the community "such portions of the company's surplus not required to safeguard the investment of its stockholders," whose dividend remained capped at six percent. Havelick and Kwartler later reported that the endowment had been delivered in CHC stock, and that within a few years the stock had collapsed in value.

=== The Great Depression and the mortgage strike ===
Between 1928 and 1933 the Depression cut Sunnyside Gardens residents' incomes by an estimated 50 percent and their net worth by 75 percent, with unemployment in the community reaching roughly 40 percent. The City Housing Corporation had sold most of its first mortgages on Sunnyside homes to commercial trust companies and large insurers, and in 1927 had pledged Sunnyside second mortgages and junior interests in first mortgages as collateral for a $2 million bond issue used to finance the company's next project at Radburn, New Jersey. By the time the strike began, CHC no longer owned most of the loans on its own homes; about 40 percent of the original first mortgages were held by the Equitable Life Assurance Society.

By February 1933 a Consolidated Home Owners Mortgage Committee, said to represent 411 Sunnyside petitioners, was urging CHC to grant an interest reduction, a three-year waiver of amortization, and a writing-down of the mortgage principal. The committee had rejected a CHC counter-offer of relief only to "cases in extreme need" as insufficient. The committee reorganized in early 1935 under chairman Charles L. Weis Jr., with Meyer Parodneck as counsel and Benjamin Ginzburg as secretary. A court-level Block Committee was established, with one elected representative for each of the development's named courts.

Early in 1935 the committee called a coordinated mortgage strike. Approximately 300 of the development's 564 home buyers stopped paying interest, demanding a reduction in the first-mortgage interest rate from 6 percent to 3 percent, a moratorium on foreclosures, cancellation of arrears and interest reduction on second mortgages, and a write-down of second-mortgage principal. CHC said that it lacked authority to grant the concessions, since the second mortgages were pledged to the bondholders financing Radburn, and the insurance companies that held the first mortgages refused.

In May 1935 CHC filed foreclosure suits against 26 Sunnyside Gardens owners. A month later Justice John H. McCooey Jr. heard arguments in Queens Supreme Court on Parodneck's motion to dismiss the suits. Parodneck contended that the mortgages had been assigned to the Irving Trust Company in 1927 as collateral for the Radburn bond issue, leaving CHC without standing to foreclose. The motion was denied. In November 1935 the American Civil Liberties Union attorney Arthur Garfield Hays joined J. Charles Laue, a strike leader on 44th Street, in defying Queens Supreme Court Justice Thomas J. Cuff's order that Laue remove a strike poster from his window or be held in contempt.

In November 1935 some 269 striking homeowners filed a separate $850,000 damage suit alleging fraud and misrepresentation against CHC, its directors, and an advisory council. The filing named 164 individuals as defendants, and an updated count of 169 was reported when the case was dismissed a year later. The complaint, covering 217 of the development's 536 properties, (Note: Sources give slightly different totals for the development depending on what is counted: Lasker tallied 564 individual home buyers, while the Times counted 536 properties.) failed to produce a judgment for the homeowners in either trial or settlement. Plaintiffs included the social-gospel leader Sherwood Eddy, the consumer-rights activist Arthur Kallet, and Mrs. Lewis Mumford, the wife of the social critic Lewis Mumford. Mumford himself was an RPAA charter member and a Sunnyside Gardens resident from 1925 to 1936. The plaintiffs' theory of fraud turned on CHC's own 1924 marketing of itself as "a limited dividend semi-philanthropic building corporation," coupled with the contention that the corporation had never qualified under the New York State Housing Law's limited-dividend provisions or set aside the reserve funds the law required.

The fraud suit's defendants included Eleanor Roosevelt (who had served on CHC's original board), Arthur Lehman, Mrs. Joseph M. Proskauer, Clarence Stein, the attorney George Gordon Battle, and Lawson Purdy, then head of the Russell Sage Foundation; the homeowners were represented by the Manhattan attorney Walter Fairchild. A later account by Sunnyside Gardens residents Franklin J. Havelick and Michael Kwartler reported that Roosevelt led protest marches as homeowners barricaded their houses against city marshals, although Lasker's contemporaneous Survey Graphic account does not mention her. Picketers from the committee distributed leaflets and sang songs at courthouse hearings, including one that began: "Sunnyside is on a mortgage holiday, / Sweeping 6 percent philanthropy away, / Second mortgagees can't make us pay." When the first eviction orders took effect, residents stationed sirens to summon neighbors who occupied foreclosed homes with chairs and bureaus to physically obstruct city marshals. John D. Rockefeller Jr., who held a large block of CHC second-mortgage bonds and was also a major shareholder in the Merchants Indemnity Company involved in the first eviction, became a particular target of the strikers' polemic.

On January 25, Mrs. Corinne Thal of 39-26 44th Street was evicted. The Brooklyn Eagle described her as the "central figure in the two-year mortgage strike." A crowd of about 250 looked on as fifteen deputies under Sheriff William F. Brunner carried furniture from the Thal house, much of it weighed down with paving and foundation blocks to slow the removal, while thirty city policemen waited outside without intervening. Six of Thal's neighbors who had occupied the house, including the Communist Party's recent candidate for Queens County judge Paul E. Crosby, were charged with disorderly conduct. Stephen J. Kelly, president of the Sunnyside Gardens Community Association, urged Mayor LaGuardia to hear the disorderly-conduct allegations against them in person.

Mr. and Mrs. James Gilleeney were evicted on March 11. Mrs. Rose Olsen lost her home on March 28. On July 27, Mrs. Toni Maxwell of 39-29 44th Street was evicted and took refuge at the home of a neighbor, Mrs. Pauline Michaelson, at 39-31 44th Street. The committee's block captain Lyons C. Carr telegraphed the Rev. Charles E. Coughlin in Royal Oak, Michigan, inviting him to address Queens homeowners as a "national champion" against "the money-changers who are foreclosing homes by the thousand every week." The telegram also invoked the Frazier–Lemke Bill, the 1934 farm-mortgage moratorium that local Congressman Barry had opposed.

In August 1936, J. Charles Laue of 39-21 44th Street, who had lost his own home in 1934, turned his living room into a public memorial. A black coffin draped in crepe held his deed and "the last green apple grown on a tree planted three years ago" in his garden, alongside the inscription "Here lies the deed to our home ... A victim of the Russell Sage Foundation's eviction policy. Killed by money lenders at 6 percent." Smaller box-coffins inside the room bore similar inscriptions for the four 1936 evictees; Thal's read, "A victim of a Rockefeller mortgage."

By June 1, 1936, 227 foreclosure actions had been instituted against Sunnyside Gardens owners, 205 by first mortgagees and 22 by second mortgagees. Of these, 46 actions had been completed with houses sold, 11 cases had been settled, and 170 remained pending. An appeal by the strikers to Governor Herbert Lehman for executive intervention was rebuffed. In a written response, Lehman said that "while I have much sympathy with all those in financial straits, I do not consider it to be the proper function of the Governor to conduct negotiations for the modification of private contracts between private individuals." A May 1936 settlement, eventually brokered with Mayor La Guardia's involvement, provided for a 25 percent reduction in second-mortgage principal and a cut in the rate to 4 percent so that the total owed would not exceed a home's value. Dozens of Sunnyside owners accepted the deal, but it failed to halt the broader wave of foreclosures.

In November 1936 the Appellate Division, Second Department reversed Queens Supreme Court Justice Mitchell May's earlier denial of motions to dismiss the homeowners' fraud suit, holding that the cause of action was "dominantly equitable in character" and that the proper remedy was reformation of contracts with CHC itself, by then under bankruptcy reorganization in federal court and unavailable as a defendant. By the time the strike collapsed, more than half of the original Sunnyside Gardens homeowners had lost their homes to foreclosure.

Reflecting on the strike in a 1949 retrospective in The Town Planning Review, Stein wrote that "the City Housing Corporation, in regard to the collection of charges on mortgages, was only the agent of the lending institutions that held the principal mortgages," and that "the City Housing Corporation, though powerless, took the full brunt of the attack from the organized people of Sunnyside." He concluded that "the disunion growing out of the conflicts in the community ... ended the most constructive development of community life, and Sunnyside has never regained its sense of unity as a neighborhood." CHC entered receivership and a federal court ordered the corporation reorganized with Sunnyside and Radburn placed under separate management. The trustees of the original easements were succeeded by a homeowners' body called the United Trustees. The 1936 Survey Graphic article that recounted the events bore the title "Sunnyside Up and Down."

=== Mid-century ===
The postwar decades brought a partial recovery of Sunnyside Gardens as both a rental investment and a new kind of residential community. By the mid-1940s the development had become "a haven for young couples leaving Greenwich Village and other more costly and crowded parts of Manhattan, in addition to a large number of artists and performers," and a 1994 New York Times "Living In" column reported that the influx of young Manhattan families during the 1940s had earned Sunnyside Gardens the contemporary nickname "the maternity ward of Greenwich Village." A substantial share of the housing stock that the City Housing Corporation and its receivers had been unable to sell during the Depression remained in corporate ownership and was rented rather than owner-occupied. In March 1947 the holding company Sunnyside Properties, Inc., sold a 71-house portfolio (comprising 27 one-family homes, 31 two-family dwellings, 7 three-family houses, and 6 four-family units, totalling 132 separate apartments and 596 rooms) to an investment syndicate brokered by the Fred Berger Company, in what the Brooklyn Eagle called "one of the biggest investment deals involving improved real estate to take place this year in the metropolitan area"; the properties extended along 39th and Skillman Avenues between 43rd and 48th Streets. Sunnyside Gardens Park remained the center of community life; among the park's earlier programs, no longer held by the late 1990s, were tennis courts frozen for ice skating, ten-cent outdoor movies, and members' wartime victory gardens. Jean Crawford, who joined the park around 1946 and remained a member for more than half a century, told the Times in 1998: "It's the only thing that keeps me in New York. ... People come here and meet each other ... It's more like the country." By 1958 the Sunnyside Gardens Community Association, which dated its founding to 1926, was still sponsoring an annual tennis tournament at the park and holding its 32nd-anniversary dance at the Astorian Manor in Astoria.

By 1960 the community remained, in Havelick and Kwartler's summary, "decidedly middle class and still relatively homogenous, with mainly Irish, Jewish, and German residents."

=== Easement expiration and the "fence wars" ===
The City Housing Corporation's original deed restrictions had been written with limits on duration at the insistence of the mortgage lenders. While permanent easements of light and air, and easements over the common walkways, were to last in perpetuity, the prohibitions on fences, sheds, additions, and changes in exterior paint color were to lapse 40 years after each block's deed was recorded. In 1956 the United Trustees organized a voluntary campaign to extend the court easements before they expired, warning that the "small oasis of grass, trees and flowers in the center of a city of cement and stone" risked becoming "a jungle of fenced plots, indifferent gardening and all sorts of sheds." The campaign succeeded only in Hamilton Court, where 54 of 60 homeowners agreed in 1964 to extend the easements in perpetuity.

When the 40-year easements began to expire in 1965 and 1966, some homeowners built fences across the common gardens to mark off private use, while others added rear additions, curb cuts, and driveways. Havelick and Kwartler described how the disputes escalated into "spite fences" and "retaliatory hedges" and how neighborly relationships frayed. By the early 1980s, of fifteen common courts and sub-courts identified by Havelick and Kwartler, only six retained their original open configuration; four were largely enclosed by fences along property lines; three were completely fenced; and two U-shaped courts were unaffected. The open plan of Colonial Court, the development's first block, which lacked a common garden, had been nearly obliterated by fences, additions, and paved-over front gardens used as driveways.

=== Preservation movement and historic-district designation ===
In November 1973 the City Planning Commission chairman John E. Zuccotti announced legislation to create a new zoning category, the Special Planned Community Preservation District, under which designated developments could not be altered without permits from both the Commission and the Board of Estimate; the proposal grew out of a Commission study of planned developments that the agency considered too recent for traditional landmark designation, and was initially prompted by a tenants' campaign at Fresh Meadow (then owned by Harry Helmsley's firm, Helmsley-Spear) seeking protection against new high-rise construction. The Commission voted in mid-June 1974 to set up the new category and to designate Sunnyside Gardens, Fresh Meadow, Parkchester, and the Harlem River Houses as the first four such districts; Commissioner Alexander Cooper, voting in favor, observed that "it is both distressing and noteworthy to realize that [these communities] could not be built today according to existing zoning." The Board of Estimate gave its approval on July 18, 1974. Under Zoning Resolution Article X, Chapter 3, no further enlargement, demolition, or substantial alteration of landscaping or topography within the district could be undertaken without a special permit from the Planning Commission; the erection of new fences was forbidden, as were new curb cuts for driveways (except on the eastern side of 50th Street). Because the new zoning was not retroactive, however, much of the damage that had been done between 1965 and 1974 remained in place. Enforcement of the new rules proved limited: a planning-department spokeswoman told Newsday in 2003 that only six applications for alterations under the special district had been submitted since 1977, the first year for which figures were available, and Sunnyside Gardens residents complained that the special zoning restrictions did not appear on Buildings Department records when owners applied for ordinary permits. Sunnyside Foundation director Dorothy Morehead told The New York Times in 1994 that of approximately 600 houses in Sunnyside Gardens about 50 had driveways, roughly half of them built illegally after 1974; in a widely publicized 1991 case the city Buildings Department had even issued a curb-cut permit in error to a homeowner at 39-90 46th Street within the district, with the resulting paved driveway subject of network-television coverage before its owner eventually removed it under continuing neighbor opposition.

In 1981 a group of residents began to organize the Sunnyside Gardens Conservancy as a community land conservancy, working with the Trust for Public Land to fund replanting, façade restoration, and a conservation-easement program offering residents tax incentives to extend the original restrictions in perpetuity. The development was nominated for listing on the National Register of Historic Places, and the National Park Service approved the listing on September 7, 1984. The original National Register district covered 53 acres with 66 contributing buildings and 12 contributing sites. The conservancy was renamed the Sunnyside Foundation for Community Planning and Preservation in 1986, and in 1989 it acquired Garmendia House, an original Sunnyside Gardens dwelling at 41-13 47th Street, as its headquarters and a center for home-restoration programs.

A grassroots campaign for local historic-district designation began in 2003, led by a new resident-organized group founded by Herbert Reynolds (at first called the Sunnyside Gardens Preservation Partnership and later renamed the Sunnyside Gardens Preservation Alliance), with the urban historian Jeffrey Kroessler (later author of a 2021 history of the development) as one of the campaign's principal advocates through the Queensborough Preservation League. The urban historian Barry Lewis, speaking to Newsday in November 2003, said the "irony with Sunnyside Gardens is that almost everyone agrees that it's a special place, but communally held property never really struck a chord in this country," adding that "when regulations are proposed to limit what people can do with their property, there has always been a fight." Opponents, whose most prominent spokesman was the attorney Ira Greenberg, complained that the Landmarks Preservation Commission's regulations would impose significant restoration costs and disproportionately burden residents on modest incomes. Ellen Barry, reporting in The New York Times a week after the LPC vote, described residents calling in "countless complaints" of building violations against neighbors who had taken positions in the debate; Council Member Eric Gioia said he had "felt like a marriage counselor at times." A WNYC report on the campaign, "Cloud Over Sunnyside?", aired in March 2007.

At a Landmarks Preservation Commission public hearing on April 17, 2007, 138 people spoke in favor of designation, including representatives of Assemblywoman Margaret Markey, Queens Borough President Helen Marshall, the Municipal Art Society, the American Institute of Architects (Queens and New York chapters), the Regional Plan Association, the Historic Districts Council, the Radburn Historical Preservation Society, and other civic and preservation organizations, alongside numerous local residents. Twenty-seven speakers opposed designation, including representatives of the Sunnyside Gardens Coalition, Preserve Sunnyside Gardens, and the Institute for Justice. Council Member Eric Gioia, who had been undecided at the hearing, sent a letter of support after the record closed. On June 26, 2007, the Commission voted unanimously to designate the Sunnyside Gardens Historic District (LP-2258), encompassing more than 600 buildings on all or part of 16 city blocks and covering approximately 77 acres, including the two Phipps Garden Apartments complexes and Sunnyside Gardens Park. LPC chairman Robert Tierney said Sunnyside Gardens "epitomizes the notion of a special sense of place"; Commissioner Margery Perlmutter said the neighborhood "has been studied, revered and emulated by generations of architects and planners"; and an LPC spokeswoman, Elisabeth de Bourbon, told reporters that the commission had received "hundreds and hundreds" of letters for and against and described it as "ironic that a group [of designers] that was so revered is being so disdained." Susan Meiklejohn, an associate professor of urban planning at Hunter College who opposed the designation, argued that landmark status would burden "the 70 percent of residents who rent, and the 11 percent who live below the poverty line"; the neighborhood's planners, she said, "would be really, I hope, amused" by a designation that "really flies in the face of what they were trying to do." On October 30, 2007, the City Council voted unanimously to confirm the designation, making Sunnyside Gardens the largest historic district in Queens. Council Member Eric Gioia, who lived half a block from the new district, said the designation showed that "you don't have to have a mansion to be landmarked"; Simeon Bankoff, executive director of the Historic Districts Council, described the development as a "democracy of architecture" and cited it as a precursor to later large-scale suburban developments such as Levittown. Greenberg continued to object, telling Newsday that "I don't think we need the taste police" and asking, "How do you landmark a social utopia?"

=== 2007 to Present ===
Sunnyside Gardens has been subject to overlapping layers of public preservation oversight since 1974. The 1974 Special Planned Community Preservation District restrictions remain on the books, and the broader Landmarks Preservation Commission historic-district designation of 2007 governs exterior alterations, demolitions, and additions throughout the historic district. Major work requires consultation with the LPC and may require a Certificate of Appropriateness. Common alteration issues in the district include incongruous façade materials, paved-over front yards, and private fences within the historic common courts.

In September 2013, a developer's proposal to relocate the Aluminaire House, a 1931 aluminum-clad prefabricated model house that had previously been displayed on the grounds of the New York Institute of Technology, to a site at 39th Avenue and 50th Street in front of a proposed eight-unit building was rejected by Queens Community Board 2 and opposed by the Historic Districts Council, whose executive director Simeon Bankoff said that the proposal "doesn't look at all like anything around it" and was "exactly contrary to the stated purpose of landmarking." After a neighborhood petition gathered nearly 4,000 signatures, the City allocated $5.5 million for the site ($2 million to acquire the lot and $3.5 million for park development) and in October 2019 dedicated it as a public park named for Michael R. Davidson, a FDNY firefighter who grew up in the adjacent Phipps Garden Apartments and was killed in a Harlem fire on March 23, 2018.

The annual St. Pat's for All parade, founded in 2000 by the activist Brendan Fay as an LGBT-inclusive alternative to the Manhattan Saint Patrick's Day Parade, runs along Skillman Avenue, at the southern edge of the historic district, between Sunnyside and Woodside. Sunnyside Gardens is one of the borough's noted trick-or-treating destinations. On Halloween, several streets within the district (44th through 47th Streets, between Skillman and 39th Avenues) are closed to traffic for the evening, an event organized by residents in coordination with the local police precinct that was expected to draw about 1,000 children in 2021.

== Architecture and landscape ==
=== Site plan and superblocks ===
Stein and Wright treated each city block as a single planning unit, in contrast to the lot-by-lot subdivision typical of New York row-house construction. Houses were built in continuous brick rows around the perimeters of each block, with private rear gardens of roughly 400 to 500 square feet (37 to 46 m^{2}) behind each home and a much larger landscaped common court at the interior of each block. Twelve such courts, most named for American presidents and other historical figures, were laid out in two principal configurations: a "courtyard" plan, in which rows of houses faced outward to the street and enclosed a single common court at the block's interior; and a "mews" plan, in which short rows of houses faced inward toward narrow common courts perpendicular to the street. The 12 named courts within the district are Carolin Gardens, Colonial Court, Hamilton Court, Hamilton Court Apartments, Harrison Place, Jefferson Court, Lincoln Court, Madison Court North and South, Monroe Court Apartments, Roosevelt Court, Washington Court, and Wilson Court Apartments, together with two Phipps Garden Apartments complexes and Sunnyside Gardens Park.

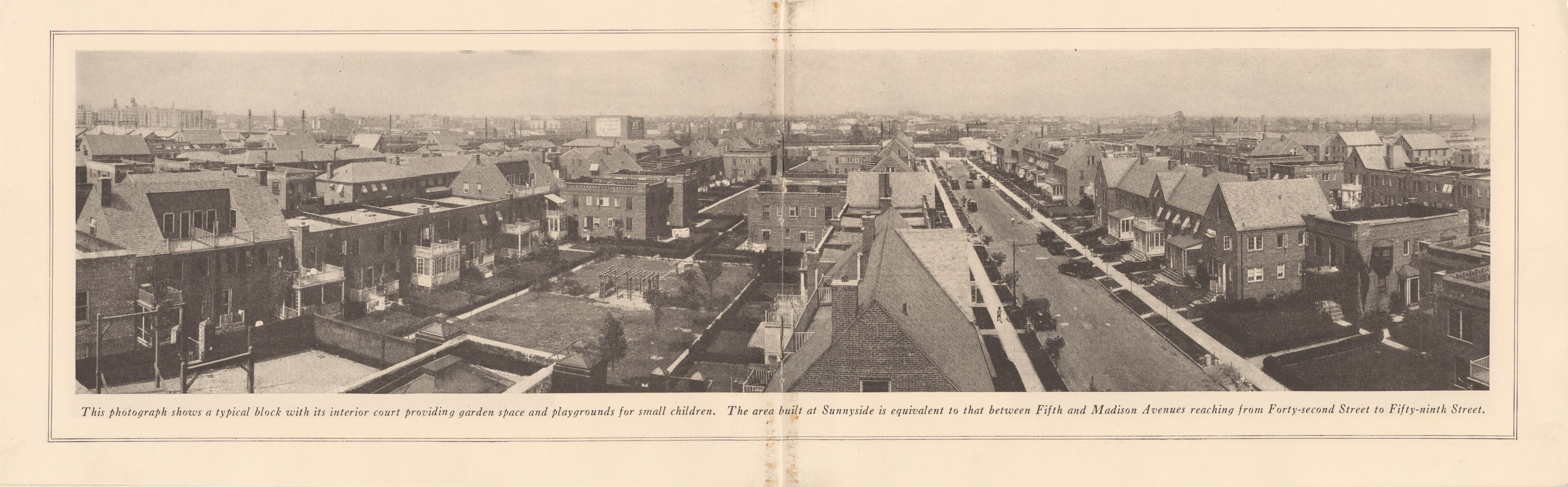
Aerial view of a typical Sunnyside Gardens block, about 1927, with perimeter row houses fronting the streets and a shared interior court between them.

To preserve the unity of the streetscape, all utilities were placed underground, an unusual measure for low-rise housing of the period. Charles S. Ascher, the City Housing Corporation counsel who administered the deed restrictions, wrote in 1932 that residents nonetheless strung outdoor radio aerials despite the buried wiring; the supervising board had eleven removed over the development's first six years, in some cases only after a year of letters, and retained a radio engineer to design an indoor antenna for the houses. Individual houses were not built with driveways or attached garages; instead, parking was provided in shared garage structures at the edges of the development, rented monthly to residents.

The block-as-planning-unit approach adapted Raymond Unwin's larger-block planning at Hampstead Garden Suburb to the constraints of the New York City street grid; Stein and Wright would realize the unconstrained version five years later at Radburn, New Jersey, where they acquired land outside an existing grid and laid out a true superblock with internal pedestrian walkways and grade-separated automobile circulation. The LPC designation report identifies Sunnyside Gardens as "the first attempt to create a Garden City in the United States," with planning ideas that the report traces forward to the New Deal greenbelt towns of the 1930s, the post-war new towns at Stevenage in England and Vällingby in Sweden, and the late-twentieth-century New Urbanism communities at Seaside, Florida and Celebration, Florida. The planning scholars Karen A. Franck and Michael Mostoller later described Sunnyside Gardens as "perhaps the most influential residential environment of the twenties."

=== Housing types ===
The development includes one-, two-, and three-family row houses and a smaller number of attached cooperative and rental apartment buildings, all of brick. The 1924 first cooperative apartment buildings, designed by Stein, contained two apartments per floor in three-story walk-ups joined in pairs by a party wall; each typical building housed six families and 27 rooms, and the six-building group included four basement apartments (one of them reserved for the resident janitor), bringing the total to 40 families across the first cooperative. The cooperative apartments were conveyed to the Sunnyside First Cooperative Housing Association, and each tenant-owner received shares of cooperative stock at $5 per share and a 99-year proprietary lease. The two- and three-family row houses were each two stories tall, with shop-fronts or porches where blocks adjoined commercial streets such as Skillman Avenue.

The LPC's designation report identifies 26 distinct house types based on the original window and door patterns of the first and second floors, catalogued A through Z, with most lettered types produced both in a standard arrangement and in a mirror image (designated, for example, Type A and Type A′). All row houses are 28 feet 4 inches wide, a dimension chosen for compatibility with standard framing lengths, and no house is more than two rooms deep, to ensure cross-ventilation and natural light. Stein and Wright varied roof types (pitched, flat, side-gable, hipped, and front-gable) and added small porches and door surrounds to create visual variety.

=== Materials and detailing ===
All buildings were faced with brick from Hudson River brickyards, inexpensive but durable, and laid in common bond. In the earliest buildings the brick walls were load-bearing; by the later phases of construction the walls were brick veneer over a steel-framed structure, but Stein continued to market the housing as "solid brick construction." Where ornament was added, it was generally in wood, in a simplified Colonial Revival vocabulary that Stein and Wright considered "reassuring" to buyers unfamiliar with the development's more unconventional design ideas; some buildings featured Art Deco brick coursing and occasional clinker brick accents. The original windows were six-over-six double-hung wood sash, most since replaced. The architectural historian Robert A. M. Stern later described the "stark minimalism" of the Sunnyside house elevations as foreshadowing the "functionalist slogans of the Modernist movement." The Phipps Garden Apartments, though designed by Stein only a few years later, departed from Hudson brick in favor of variegated face brick in geometric patterns, and were said to resemble contemporary modernist housing complexes in Germany and the Netherlands.

Sunnyside Gardens was among the developments shown in the Museum of Modern Art's 1932 exhibition Modern Architecture: International Exhibition, which introduced the International Style to American audiences; it appeared in the show's Modern Housing section, organized by the guest curator and Sunnyside resident Lewis Mumford. The organizers, Henry-Russell Hitchcock and Philip Johnson, included no photographs of Sunnyside in the catalog and in their companion book characterized such housing developments as "seldom examples of sound modern building and never works of architectural distinction." The architectural historian Caroline Constant, by contrast, locates the development's significance in its landscape rather than its buildings; comparing Sunnyside with Ernst May's contemporaneous Römerstadt estate in Frankfurt, she writes that "at Sunnyside Gardens, landscape dominates over architecture."

=== Landscape: Marjorie Sewell Cautley and the common courts ===
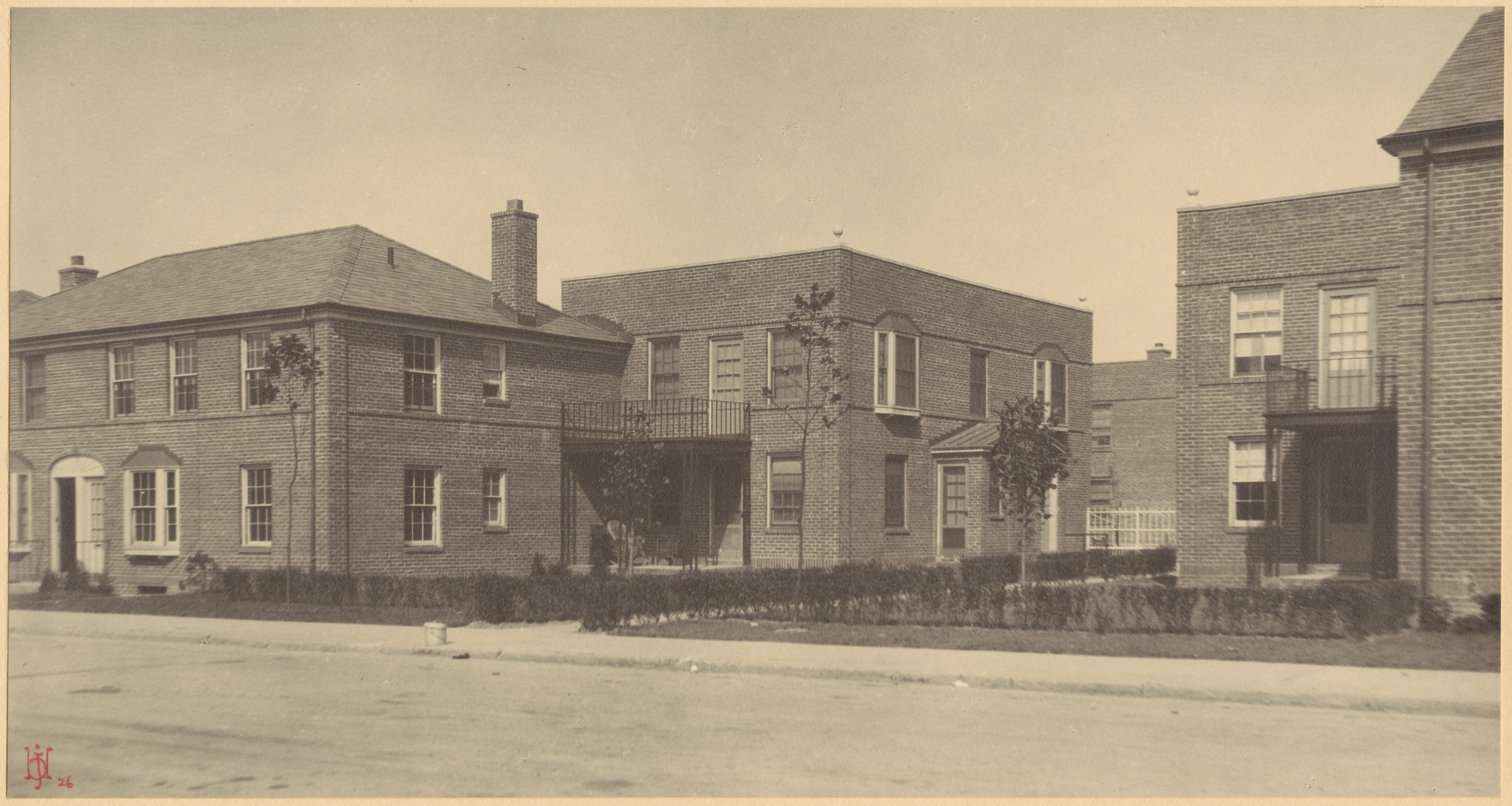
1924, with newly planted street trees

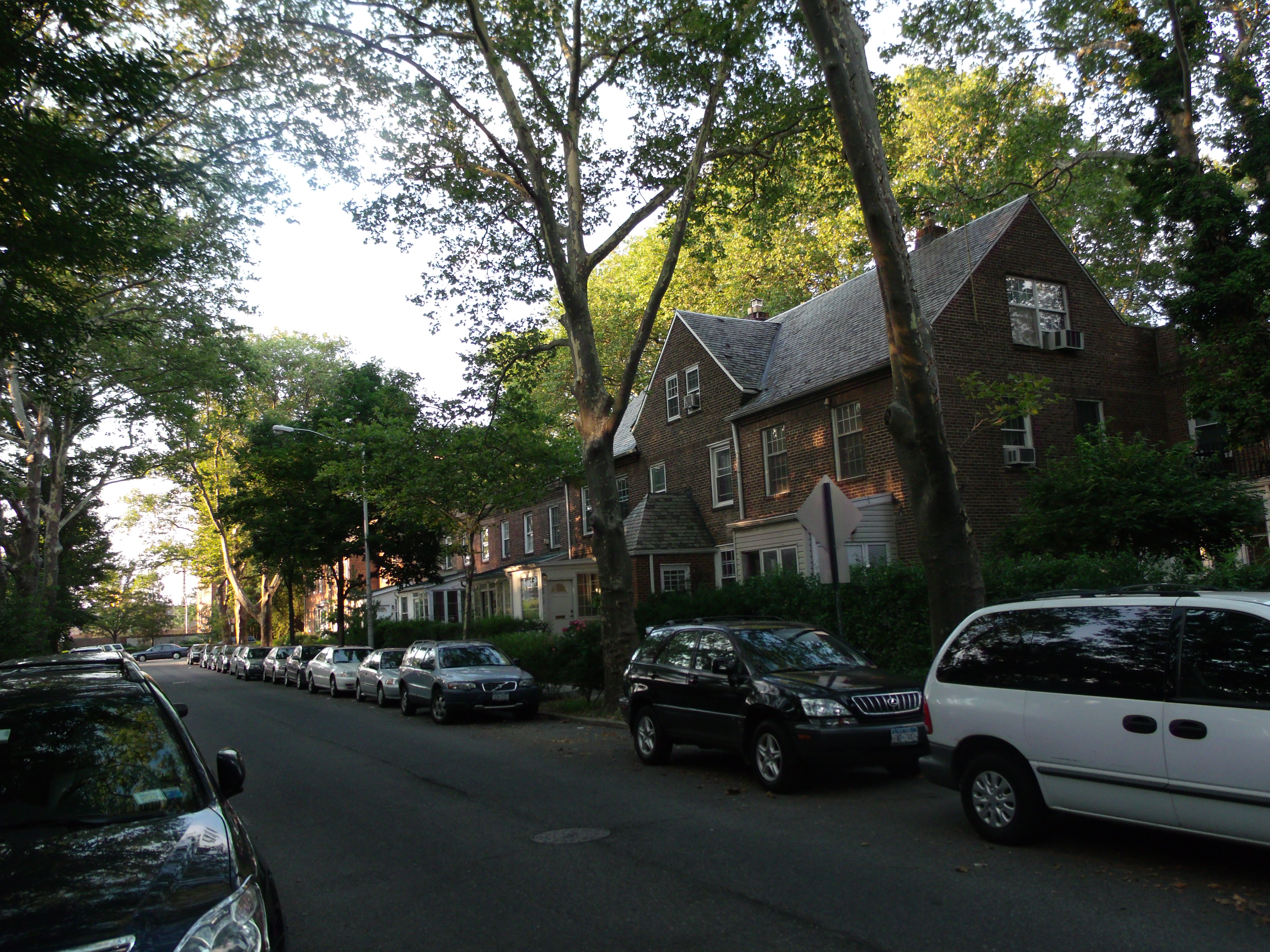
in 2012, beneath the mature tree canopy

Marjorie Sewell Cautley (1891–1954), a Cornell University–trained landscape architect and one of the earliest American women in professional practice in her field, designed the planting plans for the common courts at Sunnyside Gardens and, later, for the Phipps Garden Apartments and Radburn, New Jersey. Cautley divided the courts into turf, formal gardens, and sections of wilderness, working from the conviction that landscape design could improve the lives of residents. In the first block to be developed, the large interior court originally provided for active recreation, with a children's playground, wading pool, and tennis court; after residents of the adjoining houses found these uses too intrusive, the designers relocated active recreation to a peripheral part of the site and laid out smaller, quieter gardens in the block interiors. The historic plantings inventoried in the courts and along streets include sycamore, elm, London plane, ailanthus, linden, magnolia, dogwood, hawthorn, flowering fruit, poplar, ginkgo, and willow. Privet hedges, many of which survive, were planted to separate private from common areas without solid walls. Most courts were named for American presidents or other historical figures. A 2015 Wall Street Journal column citing a United States Forest Service study reported that Sunnyside Gardens had the densest tree canopy of any New York City neighborhood, at approximately 64 percent coverage; a local real-estate broker quoted in the column attributed the mature canopy to the development's original 1920s plantings.

=== Sunnyside Gardens Park ===
At the eastern end of the original site, CHC reserved a private community park, completed and equipped in 1925–1926 at a reported value of $125,000; secondary accounts commonly describe the park as covering about three to three and a half acres. The park land was assembled through three conveyances by CHC, with title in each case lodged in the Title Guaranty and Trust Company as trustee for the Community Trust of New York: approximately two acres on May 10, 1926, a second parcel on December 13, 1926, and a third 10,000-square-foot parcel reported by The New York Times in January 1929. The trust held the property in perpetuity for the recreational use of Sunnyside Gardens residents, with management delegated to the Sunnyside Gardens Civic Association in 1931. The park originally included a baseball field, courts for tennis, handball, basketball, volleyball, croquet, and horseshoes, and children's play areas; Havelick and Kwartler also describe a log-cabin theater in the park. A two-story brick community center, built about 1926 with funds from CHC, houses the park office, meeting space, and an apartment for the park supervisor.

Sunnyside Gardens Park is the largest privately held park in New York City and one of only two members-only parks in the city, the other being Gramercy Park. Park membership has fluctuated with the community's economic fortunes: in the early years about 700 member families paid $5 per year in dues, with CHC subsidizing the balance of the park's $8,000 annual operating budget; by 1981, with maintenance costs rising and the original CHC endowment long since worthless, 160 families paid $48 in dues; in 1998 there were 300 member families paying a $155 initiation fee and yearly dues ranging from $27.50 to $162, and each member household was required to volunteer 12 hours a year to maintain the park or coach children. Since the construction of the Phipps Garden Apartments in 1931–1935, residents of Phipps have also been eligible for park membership.

== Legacy ==
Reviewing a commemorative Clarence Stein exhibition for The New York Times in January 1977, the architecture critic Ada Louise Huxtable called Sunnyside Gardens and Radburn "the now-classic ... schemes of the 1920's" and wrote that the Stein–Wright partnership had set "the planning prototypes for the best of the post-war British and Scandinavian New Towns and for America's two (ultimately) successful new communities, Reston, Va., and Columbia, Md." Writing in The New York Review of Books in 2021, the architecture critic Martin Filler described Sunnyside Gardens as "a vital and sought-after middle-income residential redoubt in a city whose Manhattan skyline now bristles with supertall, superthin condominiums for the superrich" and praised Jeffrey Kroessler's 2021 history of the development, illustrated by Laura Heim. The historian Joshua B. Freeman, writing in the New York Daily News in 2025, described Sunnyside Gardens as the "first effort" by United States housing reformers to apply garden-city principles to families of moderate means, a precedent he traces to the federally backed expansion of garden apartment construction across postwar Queens. Sunnyside Gardens is the principal setting of Jonathan Lethem's 2013 novel Dissident Gardens, a multigenerational saga of an American Communist family in Queens; reviewing the novel in The New York Times, Janet Maslin described Sunnyside Gardens as the place in Lethem's portrait "that comes to represent World War II-era Communists."

== Notable residents ==
The social critic Lewis Mumford lived in the development from 1925 to 1936, with the LPC inventory placing his address at 40-02 44th Street in Madison Court North, and wrote about Sunnyside Gardens across several of his books, including The City in History (1961), in which he called the development "a model housing estate" for living within cities. Quoted in Stein's 1975 New York Times obituary, Mumford described Sunnyside Gardens as "an exceptional community laid out by people who were deeply human and who gave the place a permanent expression of that humanness." The housing reformer Catherine Bauer became closely associated with Sunnyside Gardens through the RPAA; her 1934 book Modern Housing featured photographs of Sunnyside and of Radburn. The actress Judy Holliday, who grew up in Sunnyside, lived at 39-45 44th Street. A bronze plaque commemorating Holliday was unveiled at the address in 2005. Other mid-twentieth-century residents documented by Havelick and Kwartler include the labor journalist A. H. Raskin of The New York Times, the painter Raphael Soyer, and the poet Florence Baker. The sculptor Joel Shapiro (1941–2025) grew up in Sunnyside Gardens in a semidetached house, the son of a physician and a microbiologist; he attended P.S. 150 in Sunnyside and became a sculptor whose works are held by the Metropolitan Museum of Art, the Museum of Modern Art, and the Whitney Museum of American Art, and whose commission Loss and Regeneration stands on the plaza of the United States Holocaust Memorial Museum in Washington.

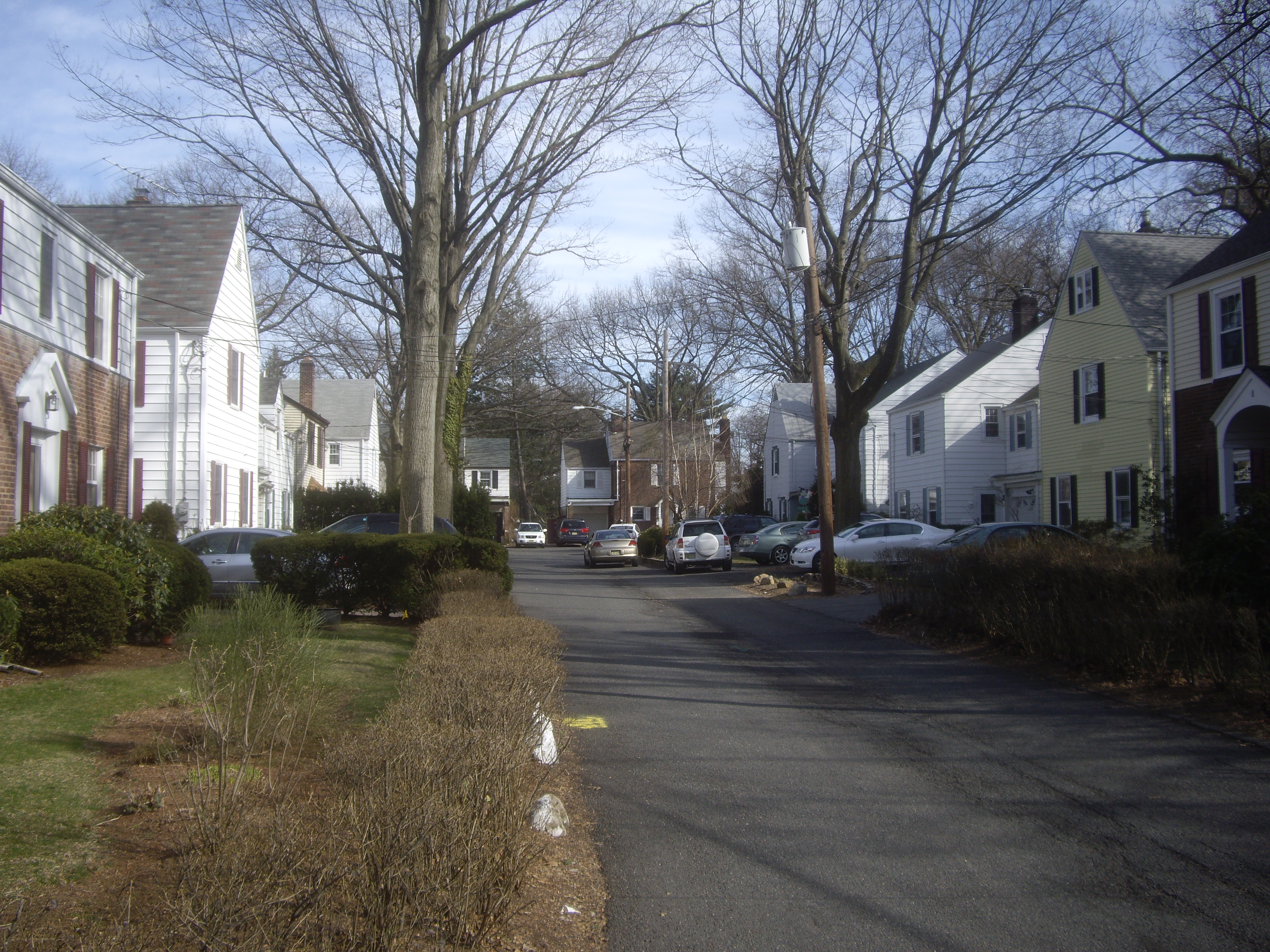
A cul-de-sac at Radburn, New Jersey (begun 1929), Stein and Wright's follow-on project in which they more fully realized the planning ideas they had begun to develop at Sunnyside Gardens

Stein and Wright went on to design Radburn, New Jersey (begun 1929), the Phipps Garden Apartments (1931–1935), and Chatham Village in Pittsburgh (1932–1936); the Radburn plan in particular extended the Sunnyside Gardens approach to a true superblock with internal pedestrian walkways and grade-separated automobile circulation.

== See also ==
- Architecture of New York City
- List of New York City Designated Landmarks in Queens
- List of Registered Historic Places in Queens, New York

== Bibliography ==
- Bauer, Catherine (1934). Modern Housing. Boston: Houghton Mifflin. OCLC 230966.
- Bing, Alexander M. (June 1926). "Sunnyside Gardens: A Successful Experiment in Good Housing at Moderate Prices". National Municipal Review. 15 (6): 330–336. doi:10.1002/ncr.4110150605.
- Constant, Caroline (2012). "Social Idealism and Urban Landscape: Sunnyside Gardens vs. Römerstadt". The Modern Architectural Landscape. Minneapolis: University of Minnesota Press. pp. 25–44. ISBN 978-0-8166-7635-4.
- Ely, Richard T. (April 1926). "The City Housing Corporation and 'Sunnyside'". Journal of Land & Public Utility Economics. 2 (2): 172–185. JSTOR 3138976.
- Emmerich, Herbert (August 1928). "The Problem of Low-Priced Cooperative Apartments: An Experiment at Sunnyside Gardens". Journal of Land & Public Utility Economics. 4 (3): 225–234. JSTOR 3139140.
- Havelick, Franklin J.; Kwartler, Michael (1982). "Sunnyside Gardens: Whose Land Is It Anyway?". New York Affairs. 7 (4): 69–77.
- Kroessler, Jeffrey A. (1991). Building Queens: The Urbanization of New York's Largest Borough (PhD thesis). City University of New York.
- Kroessler, Jeffrey A. (2021). Sunnyside Gardens: Planning and Preservation in a Historic Garden Suburb. Laura A. Heim (illustrator). New York: Fordham University Press. ISBN 978-0-8232-9380-3.
- Kurshan, Virginia; Harrison, Tara; Horak, Kathryn E. (June 26, 2007). Sunnyside Gardens Historic District Designation Report (PDF) (Report). New York City Landmarks Preservation Commission. LP-2258.
- Larsen, Kristin E. (2016). Community Architect: The Life and Vision of Clarence S. Stein. Ithaca: Cornell University Press. ISBN 978-1-5017-0246-4.
- Lasker, Loula D. (July 1936). "Sunnyside Up and Down". Survey Graphic. Vol. 25, no. 7. pp. 419–423, 439–441.
- Lubove, Roy (1963). Community Planning in the 1920s: The Contribution of the Regional Planning Association of America. Pittsburgh: University of Pittsburgh Press. OCLC 12818708.
- Mumford, Lewis (1947). Green Memories: The Story of Geddes Mumford. New York: Harcourt, Brace and Company. OCLC 650581.
- Parsons, Kermit C. (1998). The Writings of Clarence S. Stein: Architect of the Planned Community. Baltimore: Johns Hopkins University Press. ISBN 978-0-8018-5756-0.
- Pearlstein, Daniel (August 2010). "Sweeping Six Percent Philanthropy Away: The New Deal in Sunnyside Gardens". Journal of Planning History. 9 (3): 166–199. doi:10.1177/1538513210375394.
- Plunz, Richard (1990). A History of Housing in New York City: Dwelling Type and Social Change in the American Metropolis. New York: Columbia University Press. ISBN 978-0-231-06297-8.
- Schaffer, Daniel (1982). Garden Cities for America: The Radburn Experience. Philadelphia: Temple University Press. ISBN 978-0-87722-258-3.
- Stein, Clarence S. (1951). Toward New Towns for America. New York: Reinhold Publishing Corporation. OCLC 1086554.
- Tough, Rosalind (May 1932). "Building Costs and Total Costs at Sunnyside Gardens, L. I.". Journal of Land & Public Utility Economics. 8 (2): 164–174.
- Tough, Rosalind (1933). Sunnyside Gardens in Queens, New York: A Valuation of a Limited Dividend Housing Project (PhD thesis). Northwestern University.
- Way, Thaisa (October–December 2005). "Designing the Garden City Landscapes: Works by Marjorie L. Sewell Cautley, 1922–1937". Studies in the History of Gardens and Designed Landscapes. 25 (4): 298–313. doi:10.1080/14601176.2005.10435312.
