= Frederick L. Ackerman =

American architect

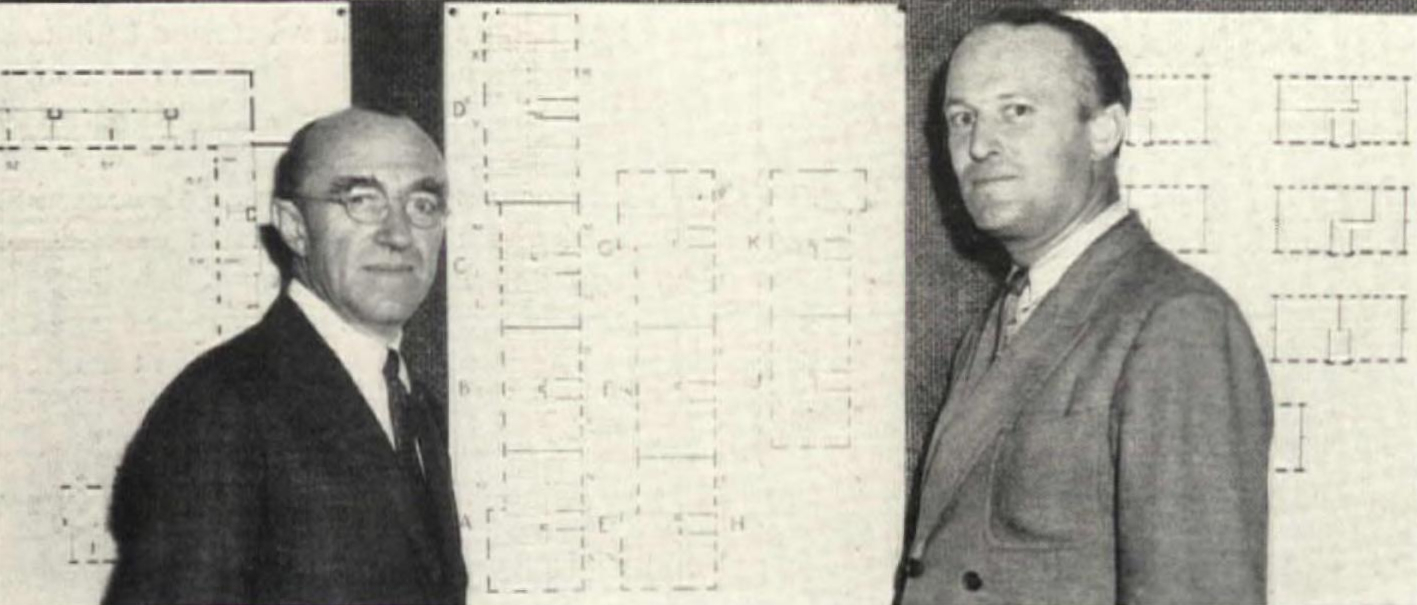
Ackerman (left) with New York City Housing Authority chairman Langdon W. Post, 1934

Frederick L. Ackerman (1878–1950) was an architect and housing reformer in the United States. He supported proactive engagement of the federal government to supply quality housing for the working class. He participated in the federal government's earliest housing program with architects Clarence S. Stein and Henry Wright on their projects Sunnyside (1924) and Radburn (1928), and worked for the New York City Housing Authority. While he favored traditional architecture and lower income housing, he also designed modernist buildings, luxury apartment buildings and home designs. Ackerman graduated from Cornell University in 1901 and designed Balch Hall on campus in 1929. He also designed Day Hall, Cornell's main administrative building, in 1947.

== First Houses ==
First Houses was a project planned as a gut rehab, with every third tenement building torn down to provide extra light and air, but architect Frederick Ackerman and his engineers soon discovered that the 19th century tenements were too fragile to be reconstructed. So they were torn down and First Houses was built from scratch, employing re-used bricks and dozens of workers on relief paid for by the federal government. According to The New York Times on November 21, 1935: "Originally scheduled as a renovation operation, it was turned into practically new construction, with only a few of the old foundation supports being utilized." Ackerman designed the apartment buildings with rear entrances and courtyards to allow more light and air than the existing tenements in the neighborhood.

First Houses were designated a New York City and National Historic Landmark in 1974. They are managed by the New York City Housing Authority.

== Technical Alliance ==
Ackerman was an original member of the Technical Alliance which later became known as the Technocracy Movement after it published its results in the early 1930s of an energy survey of North America.

Frederick Ackerman was the source of the first modern architectural handbook, Architectural Graphic Standards (1932), which was intended as a radical manifesto. Basing his practice on the economic critique of "conspicuous consumption" by Thorstein Veblen (1857-1929), Ackerman was a 'leader of the technocratic movement'. Ackerman directed his employees to develop factual architectural data. The authors of Graphic Standards, Charles Ramsey (1884-1963) and Harold Sleeper (1893-1960), worked at Ackerman's firm.

Ackerman was an editor of Howard Scott's 1933 book Introduction To Technocracy and a member of the Technocracy group called Continental Committee on Technocracy.

== Writer on architecture and social commentary ==
Ackerman wrote extensively on the social problems of his day relating many of those to the basic operating structure of society being out of step with scientific advancements. Some of Ackermans's works include:

- Our Stake in Congestion
- How Can We Live in the Sun, 1930
- A Communication, The New Republic, May 3, 1933
- Debt as a Foundation for Houses, The Architectural Forum, April, 1934
- The New New York of Tomorrow (Review)
