= Marjorie Sewell Cautley =

American landscape architect

- Born: Marjorie Sewell; 1891
- Died: 1954 (aged 62–63)
- Education: Cornell University (BS); University of Pennsylvania (MA)
- Notable work: Sunnyside Gardens; Roosevelt Commons; Radburn
- Father: William Elbridge Sewell

Marjorie Sewell Cautley (1891–1954) was an American landscape architect who played an influential yet often overlooked part in the conception and development of some early, visionary twentieth-century American communities.

== Early life ==
Cautley's father was William Elbridge Sewell, who later became Governor of Guam. She was raised in New York and New Jersey at a time when the east coast region was beginning to see a need to address the problem of housing. As the advent of the car and more sophisticated infrastructure prompted the move of many middle-class Americans to bedroom communities outside the more crowded urban areas, many designers and intellectuals saw themselves faced with the specter of unchecked, poorly designed growth. A strong interest arose in the possibilities of the Garden Cities as discrete integrations of the townscape with communal landscapes.

Cautley spent her youth in Asia and the Pacific, where her father was stationed in the Navy, yet was orphaned at twelve, at which point she was sent to live with relatives in Brooklyn. While there, she studied at the Packer Institute for Collegiate Studies. She went on to receive a B. S. degree in landscape architecture in 1917 from Cornell University, and an M.A. in City Planning from the University of Pennsylvania in 1943.

== Career ==
She was employed shortly after her graduation from Cornell by the architect Julia Morgan in Alton, Illinois, who was best known for her designs at Hearst Castle. In her work with Morgan and in setting up her own New Jersey practice in 1921, Cautley was exposed to an interest in designing communal spaces. The primary project she worked on with Morgan, during World War I, was a hotel for war workers. Her first project undertaken as an independent practitioner – at only thirty-years old – was a public park in Tenafly, New Jersey, called Roosevelt Common. One of the interesting aspects of this design, which was applied extensively in her later work, was a use of native plants to imbue the landscape with a strong sense of place.

It was perhaps Cautley’s interest in these neighborhood spaces, combined with this strong interest in local species, which caused the architects/planners Clarence Stein and Henry Wright to take an interest in her. Stein and Wright had already been experimenting with innovative housing design, and when Cautley joined their office in 1924, they began working on a now well-known housing project in the Sunnyside neighborhood of Queens in New York City, not far from the Brooklyn neighborhood where Cautley had spent much of her childhood. Sunnyside Gardens was built in response to the post-World War I housing shortage, and was intended for families of modest income. The great achievement of Sunnyside was its 200 ft. by 900 ft. “super-blocks,” with all the houses oriented towards rear courts. Only 28 percent of each block was developed, allowing for a large middle expanse to be devoted to community garden plots and public greensward. Some believe that Cautley should be largely credited for devising this housing configuration, although she is often only mentioned in passing in articles on the work of Stein and Wright. Cautley’s planting plans filled the rear court of each house with sycamores and flowering shrubs, enclosed by low hedgerows that delineated each parcel while still fostering a communal sensibility among neighbors.

After Sunnyside Gardens, Cautley went on to work on the Phipps Garden Apartments in Sunnyside (1930), and Hillside Homes (1935), yet her most well known commission with Stein and Wright was at Radburn in Fair Lawn, New Jersey, where she continued to experiment with the lessons learned at Sunnyside. Cautley wrote in detail about the planting plan for Radburn in the 1930 issue of Landscape Architecture magazine. She envisioned a community with no backyards, but simply small lawns or plots that did not encumber the extended view from the porch of each house out to the large central park, which was accessible only to neighborhood residents. “A park,” Cautley wrote, “is not a rectangular bit of turf and trees with pincushion flower beds and warning signs to keep off the grass.” Instead, she envisioned it as a “large, winding strip of land” with wide pavements on either side, flanked by shade trees that would maximize outdoor activity. The park was to be planted in stages, illustrating Cautley’s vision for a community that would develop and change over time, rather than one that is fully realized at its outset. This would ultimately allow for greater sustainability. Plant materials were selected for minimal maintenance and for all seasons, with a mind for how they would appear in years to come, and each resident had the option of personalizing his or her garden with different choices of trees, hedges, and shrubs. In her designs, Cautley was sensitive to the need for a greater sense of ownership within the community, as well as an appreciation for what she saw as the rapidly disappearing natural landscape of New Jersey.

After her tenure with Stein and Wright, Cautley accepted the position as landscape consultant to the State of New Hampshire in 1935, and went on to oversee the construction of ten state parks, including Kingston and Wentworth parks. At the same time, she taught extensively at Columbia University and the Massachusetts Institute of Technology. Cautley was also a prolific writer, publishing often in Landscape Architecture, House and Garden, American City, and the Journal of the American Institute of Planners. In 1935, she published Garden Design: The Principles of Abstract Design as Applied to Landscape Composition, and later went on to write a masters thesis in urban planning at the University of Pennsylvania on “How Blighted Areas in Philadelphia and Boston Might be Transformed” (published in American City, 1943). Throughout this time (from 1937 onwards) she was fighting a severe illness, which ultimately took her life in 1954.

== Publications ==
- 1931 Building a House in Sweden
- 1935 Garden design; the principles of abstract design as applied to landscape composition

== Selected sources ==
- Birnbaum, Charles A. Pioneers of American Landscape Design. New York: McGraw-Hill, 2000.
- Cautley, Marjorie Sewell. Planting at Radburn. Landscape Architecture, vol. 21 (October 1930).
- Martin, Michael David. Returning to Radburn. Landscape Journal, vol. 20, no.1 (2001).
- Rappaport, Nina. Sunnyside Gardens. Metropolis, vol. 10, no. 10 (July 1991).
- Marjorie Sewell Cautley's Honorary Street Sign Acknowledges Her Garden City Landscape Designs
- Allaback, Sarah. Marjorie Sewell Cautley: Landscape Architect for the Motor Age. Library of American Landscape History, 2022.
