= Regional Planning Association of America =

The Regional Planning Association of America ("RPAA"), formed by Clarence Stein was an urban reform association developed in 1923. The association was a diverse group of people all with their own talents and skills. The goal of this group was to “connect a diverse group of friends in a critical examination of the city, in the collaborative development and dissemination of ideas, in political action and in city building projects”. Throughout the ten-year span in which the association lasted, five leading members contributed to this goal. Clarence Stein, Benton MacKaye, Lewis Mumford, Charles Harris Whitaker, Alexander Bing, and Henry Wright were the essential backbone of the RPAA. Originally an idea of Clarence Stein’s, through a series of introductions and acquaintances in Washington DC in 1918, the Regional Planning Association began to form.

== Founders ==
=== Clarence Stein ===
Clarence Stein attended the Ethical Culture Society’s Workingman’s School, which influenced his interest in the city life and social responsibility through its teaching. Stein was closely influenced by the founder of Ethical Culture, Felix Adler, and teacher, John Lovejoy Elliott, in involvement with movements and committees, such as the Hudson Guild Settlement House and the Progressive Reform movement in New York City at the turn-of-the-century. Therefore, Stein’s enrollment at Workingman’s School proved to be of strong influence on his later interests and achievements. The very principle of the Ethical Culture Society being “that an individual’s growth toward excellence comes from furthering the unlike excellence of others”, exemplifies the basis of Stein’s life achievements through the RPAA.

Stein first met future fellow RPAA members, Henry Wright and Alexander Bing, in Washington (in 1918) through a friend, Charles Whitaker (editor of the JAIA). In 1920, Stein became the Associate Editor for Community Planning with the Journal of the American Institute of Architects and soon later discovered the idea to create the RPAA including his friends at the JAIA office, including Lewis Mumford, as well as many others. The group included members in various fields of study from architects to union leaders, city officials to writers, and engineers to sociologists. And so, on April 18, 1923, the first official meeting of the Regional Planning Association of America was held. The association began with only a total of eight people present at its first official meeting but it soon grew.

=== Benton MacKaye ===
The first major project of the RPAA was that of fellow RPAA member, Benton MacKaye; the Appalachian Trail, a trail which we would refer to today as a greenway, of which he wrote an article in the JAIA two years earlier (“An Appalachian Trail – A Project in Regional Planning”). The trail was planned to connect a footpath from Maine to Georgia in an attempt to “lead civilization to the wilderness”. The project was not directly implemented by the RPAA, however, their part was successful in introducing their idea to others and helping the various groups of Mountain Clubs come together to create the final project. The majority of the trail was completed by the mid-1930s. From this project came another main goal of the RPAA which was to create “the preservation of large areas of the natural environment, including parts of the wilderness, as a green matrix for shaping a “regional city” and for serving its various-sized, spatially well defined, specialized communities”.

=== Lewis Mumford ===
The success in publicizing this project as well as others was in large part due to Lewis Mumford. Mumford was the RPAA’s leading journalist and spokesperson. Having published his first book in 1922, The Story of Utopia, and well on his way with another, Mumford was extremely useful to the association. He worked on not only books and articles related to the RPAA but also wrote/edited policy documents. Mumford also contributed to the group by sharing his interest of Patrick Geddes’ ideas on regional development and planning. Mumford contributed concepts of “a dispersed yet concentrated urban culture integrated with nature” which were integrated along with MacKaye’s concepts into the RPAA’s later projects.

=== Sunnyside and Radburn ===
The leading community building experiments conceptualized and implemented by the RPAA were Sunnyside Gardens, Queens and Radburn, New Jersey. Sunnyside started as a small-scale housing development experiment in Queens, New York. The goal was “to produce good homes at as low a price as possible, to make the company’s investment safe, and to use the work of building and selling houses as a laboratory to work out better house and block plans and better methods of building”. Radburn, New Jersey, would be the new and improved built community utilizing the analysis from the Sunnyside community experiment.

through not only his own real estate company and wealth but through his outstanding real estate and business skills.  Bing, president of the RPAA, found the funds through outside contributions and personal contribution (more so than any other member) to support the projects of the association.  For the Sunnyside community project Bing founded the City Housing Corporation through which he would establish the funding and opportunity to complete the project.

=== Henry Wright ===
Henry Wright, known as the analyst due to his never-ending questioning and analysis on projects, worked alongside Stein in site designs and development on such projects as Sunnyside, New York. Studied architecture at the University of Pennsylvania along with work as a landscape architect and site planner, Wright shared many interests with Stein. Close work in 1923 on the Sunnyside Homes development with Stein led to a trip to England in 1924 to study the designs of Unwin and Parker as well as that of Ebenezer Howard. Though close at the beginning of the association’s organization, Wright went on to establish “The Housing Study Guild” along with several RPAA members which Stein viewed to work more independently than directly with the RPAA’s projects. This slight dispute would be the beginning point of the division and end of the Regional Planning Association of America. In 1933, many members began to move away and/or join various other movements or committees which quickly led to the association's end.

== Legacy ==
The Regional Planning Association of America, led by Clarence Stein, Benton MacKaye, Lewis Mumford, Alexander Bing, Henry Wright, as well as many others started simply as a group of people with similar interests wanting to make a difference in the American towns and cities. Through the collaboration of these five, Clarence Stein – the organizer and manager, Benton MacKaye – the conservationist, Lewis Mumford – the writer, Alexander Bing – the developer-builder, and Henry Wright – the analyst, as well as the many other members, the RPAA conceptualized, experimented, and changed our view of American towns, cities, architecture, and planning in America.
