= Edith Wood =

Edith Wood may refer to:

- Edith Longstreth Wood (1884–1967), American painter
- Edith Elmer Wood (1871–1945), American advocate for public health and housing reform
