= Philip Plotch =

Philip Mark Plotch is the principal researcher and senior fellow at the Eno Center for Transportation. He has been an author, professor, and transportation planner. He is best known for leading efforts to rebuild the World Trade Center and his research on the politics and planning behind transportation megaprojects.

== Career ==
=== Author and academic ===
Philip Mark Plotch is currently the principal researcher and senior fellow at the Eno Center for Transportation as well as a fellow at New York University. In 2021, he was a visiting professor and U.S. Fulbright Scholar at Sogang University. Previously he was an associate professor of political science and the director of the master of public administration program at Saint Peter's University. He has also taught as an adjunct in the Department of Urban Affairs and Planning at Hunter College.

He is the author of the book, Last Subway: The Long Wait for the Next Train in New York City (published by Cornell University Press in 2020.) He also wrote the book, Politics Across the Hudson: The Tappan Zee Megaproject (published by Rutgers University Press in 2015 with an updated version in 2018). His third book, Mobilizing the Metropolis, was published by the University of Michigan Press in 2023.

Plotch writes articles and op-eds about economic development, politics, and transportation issues that have been published in numerous academic and general publications including: Articulo – Journal of Urban Research, The Atlantic, Crain's New York, Daily News, Gotham Gazette, Governing, Journal News, Journal of Planning History, Journal of Planning Literature, Newsday, The Record, Star Ledger, Streetsblog, and the Wall Street Journal.

Plotch received the American Planning Association’s 2015 New York Metro Chapter journalism award for his in-depth research and hard hitting analysis of the planning and politics of New York's transportation system. Previous winners have included Kate Ascher, Brendan Gill, Paul Goldberger, Ken Jackson, and Elizabeth Kolbert. In 2026, he was inducted into the AICP (American Institute of Certified Planners) College of Fellows, the organization's highest honor. Dr. Plotch was nominated and selected by his peers to recognize and honor his “demonstrably significant and transformational improvements to the field of planning.”

=== Transportation planner and World Trade Center Redevelopment Director ===
As director of World Trade Center redevelopment and special projects at the Lower Manhattan Development Corporation, after the September 11 attacks, Plotch developed new transportation programs, oversaw the design and construction of Lower Manhattan open spaces, and administered programs to rebuild structures.

Between 1992 and 2005, as the manager of policy and planning at the headquarters of the Metropolitan Transportation Authority, Plotch led planning improvements for the New York metropolitan area's transportation system including the 7 Subway Extension to the Hudson Yards, the Second Avenue Subway, and intelligent transportation systems.

== Education ==
Plotch received his master in urban planning degree from Hunter College and his Ph.D. in public and urban policy from the Milano School of International Affairs, Management, and Urban Policy at The New School.

== Civic leadership ==
He lives in the Radburn section of Fair Lawn, New Jersey, where he has published Fair Lawn News, served on the planning board and the economic development committee, and led efforts to revise election procedures and improve pedestrian safety.
