= Henry Wright (planner) =

American landscape architect

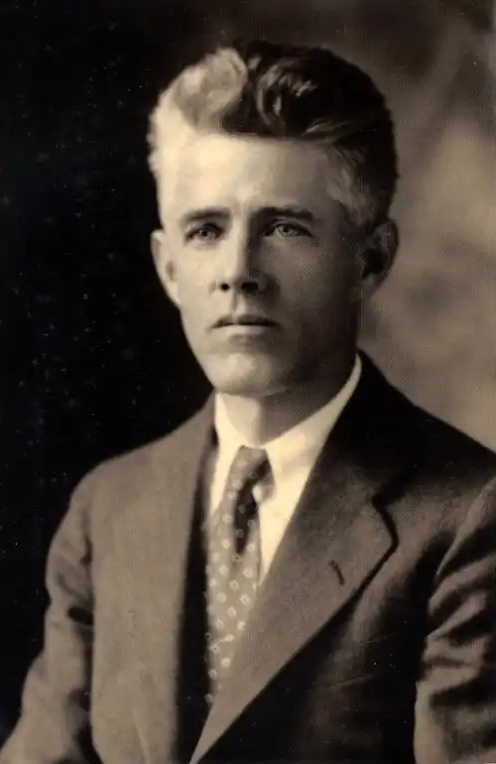
- Wright circa 1920
- Born: 1878; Lawrence, Kansas, U.S.
- Died: July 9, 1936 (aged 57–58); Newton, New Jersey, U.S.
- Education: University of Pennsylvania
- Occupations: architect; planner
- Spouse: Eleanor Niccols
- Children: 4

Henry Wright (1878 – July 9, 1936), was a planner, architect, and major proponent of the garden city, an idea characterized by green belts and created by Sir Ebenezer Howard.

== Early life ==
Henry Wright was born in Lawrence, Kansas in 1878. His family was Quaker and he based many of the ideas for his communities on Quaker ideas. He graduated from the University of Pennsylvania in 1901.

== Career ==
=== Early career ===
In 1902 Wright helped architect George Kessler design the Louisiana Purchase Exposition in St. Louis, Missouri, when he was only 23 years old. By the early 1920s Wright became one of the core members of the Regional Planning Association of America, along with Clarence Stein, Lewis Mumford, and Benton MacKaye, and it was this association that led to Wright's most well-known work.

=== Brentmoor Park, Brentmoor, and Forest Ridge ===
Early in his career, Wright designed Brentmoor Park, Brentmoor, and Forest Ridge, three private subdivisions in the city of Clayton, Missouri, a suburb adjoining St. Louis, that were platted in 1910, 1911 and 1913, respectively. Wright later said that the origins of his planning concepts lay in his St. Louis developments.

Wright designed all three of his projects to face inward toward their common grounds and away from the noise and congestion of Wydown Boulevard and the trolley line which ran along it (now gone). The subdivisions share common characteristics such as limited access from surrounding thoroughfares, curving interior drives, one to almost 3-acre (12,000 m^{2}) lot sizes, and large traditionally designed houses. Brentmoor Park is designed around a draw, or small valley, which has its lowest point near the intersection of Big Bend and Wydown. This natural land formation forms the common ground of a rectangular 33.8-acre (137,000 m^{2}) tract. The 23-acre (93,000 m^{2}) tract encompassing Forest Ridge has only six homes, and rises to a central plateau with the lots planned around a large circular private park. Brentmoor has a simple oval plan due to the evenness of its 49.8 acres (202,000 m^{2}). The three subdivisions in this district contain forty-seven houses, twenty-one of which were built in the first decade after the sites were opened, with an additional sixteen built before 1930.

The period-style houses in all three subdivisions were designed by local and out-of-town architects, including Howard Van Doren Shaw of Chicago and Raymond Maritz. The large, carefully designed houses are about evenly divided between medieval and Georgian styles. Among the civic leaders who have lived here are J. Lionberger Davis, Stratford Lee Morton, and Morton D. May. In 1982, the National Park Service listed the Brentmoor Park, Brentmoor and Forest Ridge District on the National Register of Historic Places.

=== Hi-Pointe DeMun ===
Also in St. Louis, The Hi-Pointe DeMun Historic district straddles the border of St. Louis (Independent City) and the suburb of Clayton in St. Louis County. Platted in 1917 and 1923 respectively, Wright prepared the plat for the Hi-Pointe subdivision and was a trustee, and likely had input in the later design of the DeMun Park plat by his close associates Julius and Fredrick Pitzman. The two subdivisions include 484 residential and commercial buildings and detached residential garages. Most of the construction of the subdivisions was completed by 1930 and the district retains a high degree of integrity from that period with 455 contributing resources. The area was designed to include four small parks to provide open and recreational space for residents. In the early years, a streetcar line located on DeMun Avenue in the middle of the district provided transportation. Today, the former streetcar bed is set aside as green space.

=== Sunnyside Gardens ===
Wright and Clarence Stein designed Sunnyside Gardens, in the Sunnyside neighborhood of the New York City borough of Queens, was one of the first developments to incorporate the "superblock" model in the United States. The complex was constructed from 1924 to 1929.

The residential area has brick row houses of two and a half stories, with front and rear gardens and a landscaped central court shared by all. This model allowed for denser residential development, while also providing ample open/green-space amenities. Stein and Wright served as the architects and planners for this development, and the landscape architect was Marjorie Sewell Cautley. These well-planned garden homes are listed as a historical district in the National Register of Historic Places, and are also home to one of the only two private parks in New York City.

=== Radburn ===
Wright and Stein later collaborated on the design of the Radburn community in Fair Lawn, New Jersey. Radburn, founded in 1929, was intended to be the "town in which people could live peacefully with the automobile-or rather in spite of it". Radburn was designed in such a way that thoroughfares had a specialized use; main roads linking traffic at various sections, service lanes to allow direct access to buildings, and express highways. The desire was also to have as complete a separation of automobile and pedestrian as possible. Pedestrian crossways were designed at differing levels than that of autos, and were directed differing places than autos. These largely residential areas were termed "superblocks".

Radburn was also intended to become a garden city characterized by surrounding greenbelts, and the careful design of residential, industrial and agricultural land. Residential areas were designed to face inwards towards gardens and nature rather than out towards traffic. Unfortunately, the Great Depression proved the end of the "Radburn idea". Only a minute section was completed before the operation was forced to stop. The originally-planned manufacturing area never materialized, so the town became a commuter city, despite the planners' best hopes. The other main problem to appear were extremely high costs of developments of this type, as well as the large amount of land that it consumed. However, the city did achieve a very high level of pedestrian walkability.

=== Chatham Village ===
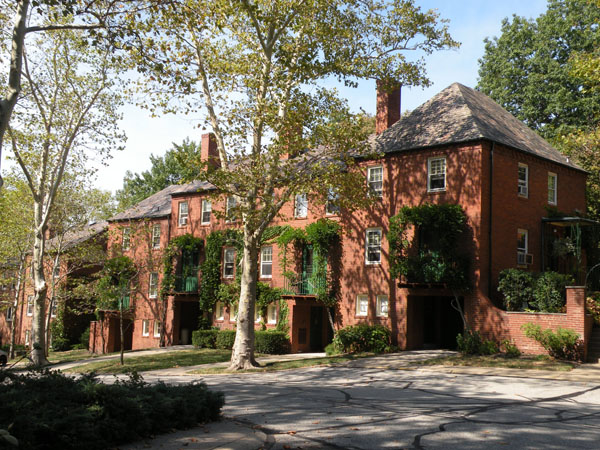
Chatham Village (2010)

From 1929 through 1936, Wright and Stein designed the first two phases of the Chatham Village community, which was constructed in three phases in 1932, 1936 and 1956 in Pittsburgh, Pennsylvania. Chatham Village's distinctive design was based on the ideals of the Garden City movement, including single ownership and the protective greenbelt of undeveloped land, but drew heavily on elements of the "Radburn Idea," particularly the use of superblocks with interior parks, and the complete separation of automobile and pedestrian. Designed as a high-density community for moderate-income workers, the Georgian Revival houses were constructed in attached groups. Cost savings were realized through the use of the superblock design with its reduced infrastructure investment, and high-density attached dwellings to lower construction costs. The successful use of attached grouped dwellings in a garden environment, demonstrated at Chatham Village, influenced the growth of the garden apartment-style subdivision in American urban and suburban planning. Built during a time of rapid technological change, the 'reverse-front' orientation of house groups, facing the open courtyards in the superblocks' center, evoked the comfort of the traditional English village. The meticulously designed and maintained landscaping of the terraced greens and courtyards dramatically enhanced the village atmosphere and provided the healthy environment thought to be necessary for modern living. Wright's innovative 'reversefront' design of the houses, in which service rooms face the street and living rooms face the interior park, turned the focus of the community inward, away from the noise and activity of surrounding development. In 1998, the National Park Service listed Chatham Village on the National Register of Historic Places.

=== Buckingham ===
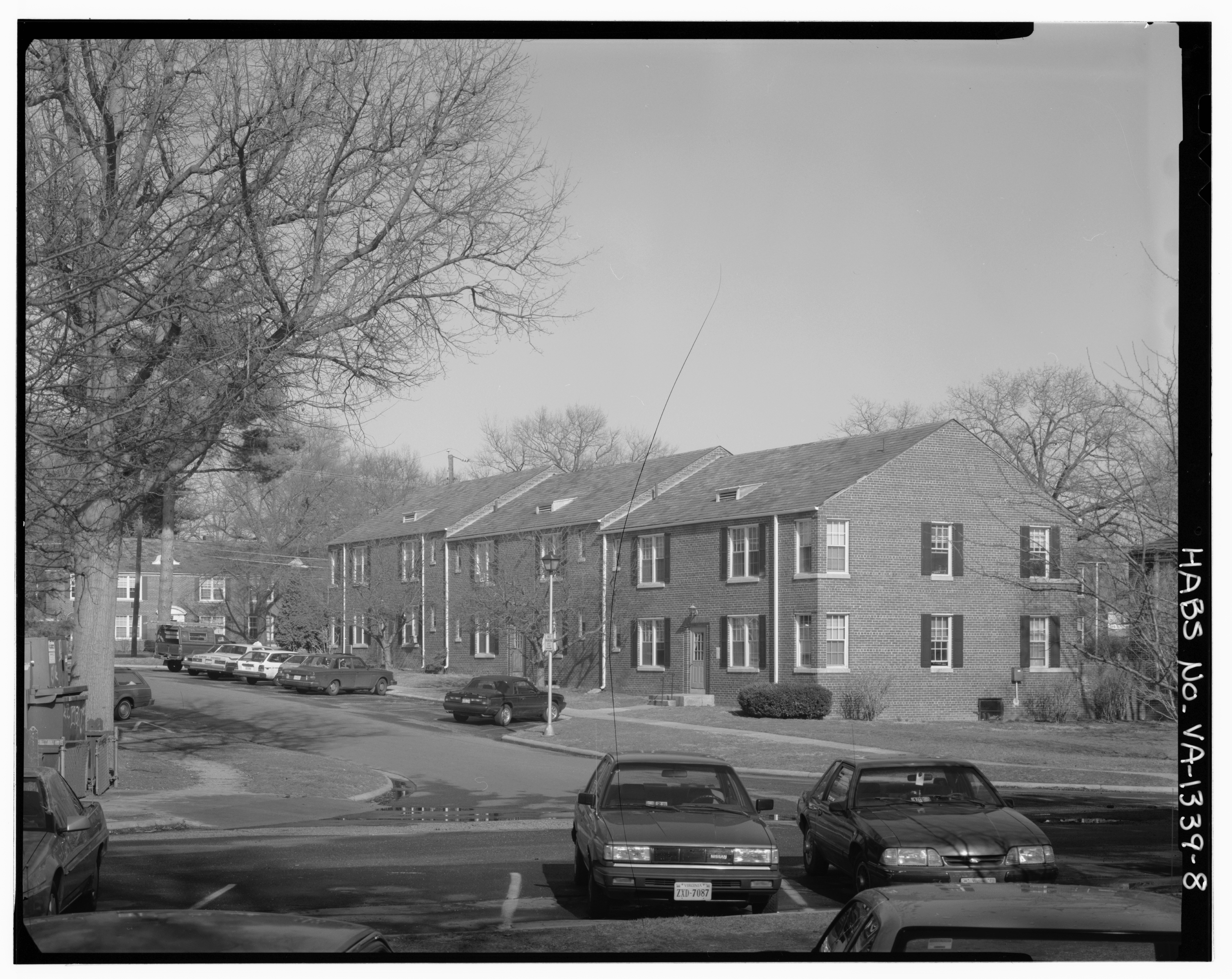
Buckingham Apartment Complex

During the mid-1930s, Wright designed a residential apartment community (Buckingham Community) that was constructed in six phases between 1937 and 1953 on former farm land in Arlington County, Virginia, near Washington, D.C. Wright designed the first of these phases in the Colonial Revival style; the later phases also incorporated this style. Intended to be a middle-income neighborhood, the complex was funded by the Federal Housing Administration. The garden apartment complex applied pioneering principles of garden city planning to a large-scale planned residential community. These principles include low-density superblocks, curving streets, separation of automobiles and pedestrians, shallow two-to-three story building plans allowing improved light and ventilation and landscaped common spaces designed around apartments to form a continuous park. The buildings are arranged in U-shaped complexes enclosing grassy lawns planted with oak and elm trees. Wright located a shopping center at the intersection of two major streets in the middle of the community, evoking the idea of a traditional village center.

The Arlington County government has protected some of Buckingham's buildings by designating them as components of a local historic district. Demolition has occurred, however, resulting in the loss of thirty buildings since 1953. The National Park Service listed parts of the Buckingham Historic District on the National Register of Historic Places in 1999, 2004 and 2010.

=== Other career ===
Wright helped plan the campus for Western Kentucky University (then named Western Teachers College). Wright also worked as a consultant for the housing division of the Public Works Administration in 1933 and 1934. He was an associate professor of architecture and head of the School of Architecture at Columbia University. In December 1935, he was appointed to the committee of architects to draft a general plan for the World's fair.

Wright wrote the book Rehousing Urban America in 1935. He was a Fellow of the American Institute of Architects and chairman of the City Planning Association of St. Louis, Missouri and the founder of Housing Study Guild.

== Personal life ==
Wright was married to Eleanor Niccols. Together, they had four children: Elliott, Henry N., Marion and Eleanor.

== Death ==
Wright died on July 9, 1936, at Newton Memorial Hospital in Newton, New Jersey.

== Legacy ==
The Henry Wright Park in the Buckingham Historic District in Arlington, Virginia is named in his honor.
