= Meyer Parodneck =

American social advocate (1904–1994)

Meyer Parodneck (1904–1994) was a Polish-born American social advocate known for establishing community-based self-help initiatives in New York City.

== Biography ==
Born in Poland, Parodneck immigrated to Manhattan at age ten and grew up in poverty on the Lower East Side. He graduated from New York Law School in 1924 and practiced as a trial lawyer and corporate counsel.

During the Great Depression, Parodneck focused increasingly on social issues, notably organizing public rallies to prevent homeowner evictions and lobbying Congress for mortgage relief legislation. In 1938, in response to the needs of urban consumers and struggling dairy farmers, he co-founded the Consumer-Farmer Milk Cooperative, the first such consumer-farmer cooperative in the United States. Initially distributing 10,000 quarts of milk per day at prices slightly below market rates, the cooperative expanded significantly, eventually operating milk-processing facilities in New York, New Jersey, and Pennsylvania.

By the 1970s, as affordable milk became widely accessible, Parodneck redirected the cooperative's resources toward housing through the newly established Consumer-Farmer Foundation. The foundation provided low- and no-interest loans for rehabilitating tenant-occupied and abandoned buildings in Manhattan and Brooklyn, an approach known as urban homesteading.

In 1993, the Consumer-Farmer Foundation was renamed as the Parodneck Foundation for Self-Help Housing and Community Development in his honor.
