= Clarence Stein =

American urban planner, architect, and writer

- Stein and his wife Aline MacMahon
- Born: June 19, 1882; Rochester, New York, U.S.
- Died: February 7, 1975 (aged 92); New York City, U.S.
- Education: Columbia University; École des Beaux-Arts
- Occupations: Urban planner, architect, writer
- Known for: Proponent of the Garden City movement
- Spouse: Aline MacMahon (m. 1928)

Clarence Samuel Stein (June 19, 1882 – February 7, 1975) was an American urban planner, architect, and writer, a major proponent of the garden city movement in the United States known for the Radburn concept.

== Biography ==
Stein was born in Rochester, New York, into an upwardly-mobile Jewish family. While a youth, his family decamped to New York City, where he was immersed in the milieu surrounding the Ethical Culture Society, attending its Workshop School and developing his sensibilities within the context of Progressive thought: the integration of physical and mental labor, the importance of a universal humanistic philosophy, the concept of a nurtured individualistic sensibility. Intense and self-absorbed, the young Stein had a nervous collapse shortly before he was scheduled to leave for college, experiencing a bout of what was then called neurasthenia for which he was sent to Florida to endure a rest cure.

He returned to New York and worked in his family's casket business, where the combination of physical and mental labor matched the philosophy in which he had been educated, much in keeping with his contemporary John Dewey. After a year or so, he prepared to attend college, embarking on an American version of the Grand Tour: travel to the artistic and cultural centers of Europe, in this case in the company of his father. Returning to the United States, he immersed himself in work in the Progressive settlement house movement. In concert with his brothers and a small cohort of like-minded young men, many of whom would be influential partners for the rest of his career, Stein started the Young Men's Municipal Club, an organization modeled on many other such burgeoning social amelioration movements (Jane Addams's Hull House is an example) and dedicated to studying and then agitating for improvements to the chaotic life of the modern city.

While at work on that mission, Stein began to take classes at Columbia University, but they were not the traditional liberal-arts courses common at an Ivy League academy. Instead, he focused on a progressive curriculum newly installed at Columbia under the influence of Dewey: cabinet making, furniture design, and the useful arts. Having been deeply impressed by the vision of modern Paris while on his European tour, Stein decided to attend the prestigious, École des Beaux-Arts in Paris, where many outstanding American architects were seeking training in design according to classical principles.

Training at the École as an architect-designer required immersion in what is today known as Beaux-Arts Classicism, a rigorous pedagogy that sought to train architects and artists in the grand tradition that began with the Greeks, passed through Rome and then the Renaissance, and emerged as the modern equivalent of humanistic philosophies.

Upon returning to America, Stein joined the office of the progressive, eclectic architect Bertram Goodhue and his more eccentric partner Ralph Adams Cram in 1911 and contributed to three of Goodhue's large-scale projects of that time: the Panama–California Exposition in San Diego, California, the company town of Tyrone, New Mexico, and the master plan and individual buildings for the California Institute of Technology in Pasadena. While working on these extraordinary planning schemes he participated in the birth of modern urban design in the United States. While marginally influenced by Ebenezer Howard, the English Garden City advocate, Stein was more attuned to the planning innovations of his American contemporaries: Edward Bennett, John Nolen, and John Charles Olmsted.

In 1919, Stein started his own practice in New York, and in 1921, he began his long association with fellow architect Henry Wright. The two were influential in the 1930s, designing New Town projects, sponsored by New Deal visionaries: Radburn, New Jersey, Sunnyside Gardens, Queens, and Chatham Village, Pittsburgh.

In 1923, Stein also cofounded the Regional Planning Association of America (RPAA) to address large-scale planning issues such as affordable housing, the impact of sprawl, and wilderness preservation. Other founding members included Lewis Mumford and Benton MacKaye; the RPAA helped MacKaye develop his vision for what would become the Appalachian Trail. The RPAA has remained a formative and influential organization in regional planning, especially in the New York Metropolitan area. Stein served as a president of the RPAA from 1925 to 1948.

From 1923 to 1926, Stein served as chairman for the New York State Housing and Regional Planning Commission.

Stein travelled extensively to other countries and established friendships with among others Swedish statesman-planner Yngve Larsson.

== Personal life ==
From 1928 to his death in 1975, Stein was married to stage and film actress Aline MacMahon. They had no children.

== Accomplishments ==
Beginning in 1923 Stein and Henry Wright collaborated on the plan for Sunnyside Gardens, a neighborhood of the New York City borough of Queens. The 77-acre (310,000 m^{2}) low-rise pedestrian-oriented development was constructed between 1924 and 1929. It was funded by fellow RPAA officer Alexander Bing and took the garden city ideas of Sir Ebenezer Howard as a model. This neighborhood has retained its special character and has been listed on the National Register of Historic Places.

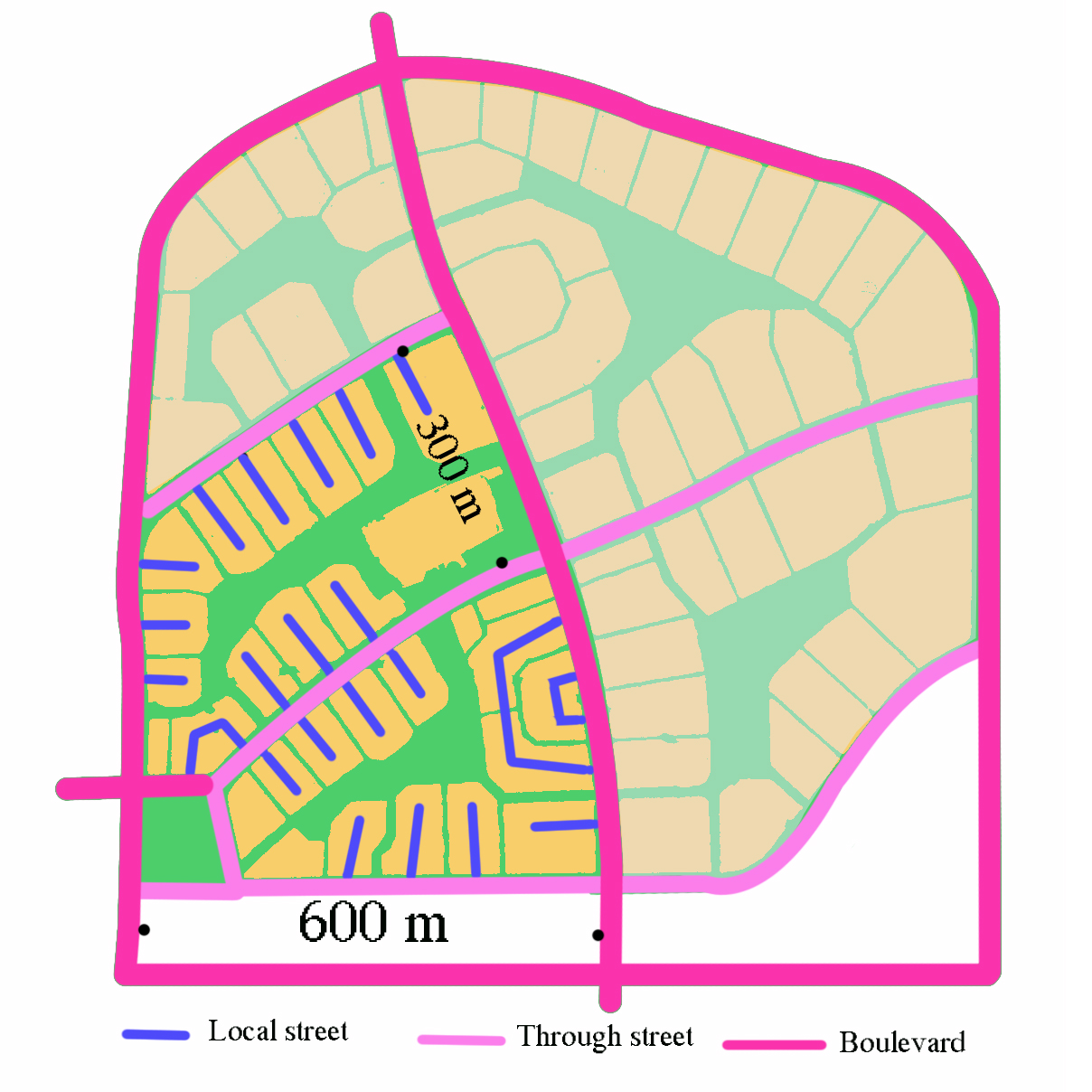
A diagram showing the street network structure of Radburn and its nested hierarchy. Separate pedestrian paths run through the green spaces between the culs-de-sac and through the central green spine (the shaded area was not built)

Construction for Sunnyside started April 1, 1924, two months after it was purchased from Pennsylvania Railroad. Because of the high costs of urban land, many neighborhoods were congested and run down, making it unhealthy and an unenjoyable place to live in. Sunnyside was different; the land was not being used by the railroad company so it was cheap. Stein had a very important job with Sunnyside. He was responsible not only for developing a more generally affordable neighborhood, but also making it a healthy and enjoyable place to live. He designed more natural green space with much light, resulting in a serene living environment. In between all the apartment buildings there was a central public open space, such as a play ground or mini park. The park was then surrounded by individual private gardens that went to the ground level of the apartments. Gardens were also placed on the front of the apartment buildings between the road and the building. This helped break up the long lines of houses and also created an appealing mood. Stein needed as much space as possible to incorporate gardens and open areas. Because of this, he had to place the garages by themselves separate from the apartment buildings. The ending outcome of Sunnyside was very successful.

In 1929, Stein and Wright collaborated on the plan for the Radburn community in Fair Lawn, New Jersey, roughly double the area of Sunnyside. The vision for Radburn was of an integrated self-sustaining community, surrounded by greenbelts, specialized automotive thoroughfares (main linking roads, serviced lanes for direct access to buildings, and express highways), and a complete separation of auto and pedestrian traffic. These thoroughfares were called superblocks. This was because the block is very large with a very large road surrounding the houses within. Stein knew that the community could not survive without a road system but he also didn't want the roads dominating the land. Instead, the superblocks make the main focus on the yards and the gardens surrounding the buildings. This grand vision was informed by the lessons of Sunnyside, and by the comparable city-planning work of Ernst May in Germany (researched by a young Catherine Bauer), but the experiment was never completed because of the economic pressures of the Depression. Due to the Depression and different land issues, Radburn was not able to become a Garden City, but it was still impressionable because the superblock was a very successful idea that has been repeated numerous times.

In the 1930s, Stein and the other members of the RPAA saw their social housing cause adopted by the government, at least for a while. They lobbied for the creation of government-sponsored planned communities, under the short-lived Resettlement Administration, and planned for 22 green-belt resettlement towns across the country. Three were built: Greenbelt, Maryland, Greendale, Wisconsin, and Greenhills, Ohio. The others were halted when the Resettlement Administration was dissolved in 1936.

Among Stein's other urban-planning credits are the five-city-block Hillside Homes in Williamsbridge, the Bronx, as a Public Works Administration project in 1935; part of the massive wartime labor-force housing at the Walt Whitman Houses in Fort Greene, Brooklyn; Baldwin Hills Village (now the Village Green) in Los Angeles, California in 1941; and his only postwar commission, the re-planning of Kitimat, British Columbia, in 1951.

Stein wrote Toward New Towns for America in 1951, and received the AIA Gold Medal in 1956.

== Death ==
Stein died on February 7, 1975, at his home in New York City.

== Other accomplishments ==
- Village Green, Los Angeles
- Baldwin Village, Los Angeles
- Chatham Village, Pittsburgh
- Green Brook, New Jersey
- Greenbelt, Maryland
- Greendale, Wisconsin
- Kitimat, British Columbia
- Phipps Garden Apartments (I) and (II), New York City
- Valley Stream Project

== Published work ==
- The Writings of Clarence S. Stein: Architect of the Planned Community, 1998
- Toward New Towns for America, 1951
- Kitimat: A New City, 1954
- Report of the Commission of Housing and Regional Planning to Governor Alfred..., 1925
- Primer of Housing, 1927 (co-author)
- Store Buildings and Neighborhood Shopping Centres, 1934
- Radburn, Town for the Motor Age, 1965
- Hillside Homes, 1936

== Sources ==
- Stein, Clarence. (1951). Toward New Towns for America: MIT Press
- Stein, Clarence. (2005). Infoplease Web site: http://www.infoplease.com/ce6/people/A0846615.html
- Stein, Clarence. (1957). "Toward New Towns for America: with an introduction by Lewis Mumford
- Stein, Clarence (1998). Kermit C. Parsons (ed.). The Writings of Clarence S. Stein: Architect of the Planned Community. Baltimore, Maryland: Johns Hopkins University Press. ISBN 0-8018-5756-2.
- Stein's papers at Cornell
- The Village Green Web site
- Modern Architectural Theory: A Historical Survey, 1673–1968, Dr. Harry Francis Mallgrave
