= Edith Elmer Wood =

American public health activist and housing reformer

- Born: September 24, 1871; Portsmouth
- Died: April 29, 1945 (aged 73); Morristown
- Resting place: United States Naval Academy Cemetery
- Alma mater: Smith College; Columbia University; Columbia School of Social Work
- Occupation: Novelist, health activist

Edith Elmer Wood (September 24, 1871 – April 29, 1945) was an American advocate for public health and housing reform. Wood was a proponent of the construction of public housing, arguing that overcrowded slums and their associated communicable diseases were not the fault of immoral tenants or landlords, but a systemic economic problem needing solutions at the governmental level.

She served in leadership roles for several housing organizations and was an advisor to the United States Housing Authority; her advocacy significantly impacted on the housing reforms implemented in the 1930s and 1940s through the New Deal and the Fair Deal.

== Early life and education ==
Edith Elmer was born September 24, 1871, in Portsmouth, New Hampshire. She was the daughter of U.S. Navy Commander Horace Elmer and Adele Wiley Elmer. Her maternal grandfather, John A. Wiley, was a prominent South Jersey physician who was interested in civic improvements. Her father's military assignments led to the family living in locations across the United States and Europe; Edith and her brother were educated with tutors and governesses.

She received her bachelor's degree from Smith College in 1890. Wood later went on to graduate from the New York School of Philanthropy in 1917. She earned two degrees from Columbia University: a Master of Arts degree in 1917 and a Ph.D. in political economics in 1919.

She married Navy Lieutenant Albert Norton Wood on June 24, 1893 at the Brooklyn Navy Yard. They had four children: Horace Elmer (who died as a young child), Thurston Elmer, Horace Elmer II, and Albert Elmer. During the early years of their marriage, Edith spent her time caring for her children as well as writing travel literature and genteel novels such as Her Provincial Cousin: A Story of Brittany (1893) and Shoulder-straps and Sun-bonnets (1901).

== Activism in public housing ==
The family was living in Puerto Rico in 1906 when their servant contracted tuberculosis. After realizing there were no care facilities on the island, Wood became interested in improving public health facilities for the poor. She may also have been prompted to take action after the death of one of her children due to contagious disease. Wood founded the Anti-Tuberculosis League of Puerto Rico in 1906 and served as its president for three years. Recognizing the need to improve housing conditions to control the spread of disease, she wrote a new housing code for San Juan.

Her husband retired from the Navy in 1910 and the family returned to the United States. They eventually moved to Washington D.C. and from 1913 to 1915 Wood surveyed the district's alley dwellings, where most residents were African Americans by the turn of the nineteenth century. While the accepted wisdom of New York State's Tenement House Commission believed that irresponsible tenants and landlords created poor housing conditions, Wood felt the residents lacked other alternatives and that eviction was not the answer. Wood and her family moved to New York City so she could attend the New York School of Philanthropy; she went on to earn advanced degrees at Columbia University. Her Ph.D. dissertation, titled "The housing of the unskilled wage earner: America's next problem," argued that a national policy should be developed that provided low-cost public housing. Her dissertation was published by Macmillan in 1919. While a student at Columbia, Wood prepared an administrative study for the New York Bureau of Municipal Research and served as an advisor for the Women's Municipal League of Boston.

After 1919, Wood and her family lived in Cape May Court House, New Jersey. From that location, she advised several commissions and served in leadership roles for multiple organizations focused on housing. Wood became the chair for the American Association of University Women's national committee on housing, a position she would hold from 1917 until 1929. From 1926 to 1930 Wood taught courses at Columbia on housing economics and public policy. She served on the executive committee of the International Housing Association from 1931 to 1937. In 1932 she became the vice president of the National Public Housing Conference, going on to serve as director of the organization from 1936 to 1945. She was also a cofounder of the National Association of Housing Officials in 1933.

Along with Catherine Bauer Wurster, Wood was a significant influence on the formulation of the New Deal housing policy. From 1933 to 1937, she advised the housing division of the New Deal agency the Public Works Administration. The passage of the Wagner-Steagall Housing Act of 1937 included the construction of the nation's first publicly funded housing units, campaigned for by Wood and similarly-minded advocates. She advised the United States Housing Authority from 1938 to 1942. The housing policy she supported would go on to be considerably realized in the Housing Act of 1949, a sweeping expansion of the construction of public housing.

== Later life and death ==
In honor of the impact of her advocacy, Smith College awarded her an honorary LL.D. in 1940. After suffering a heart attack in 1943, Wood continued her work even though bedridden; poor health forced her to retire the following year.

Wood died in Morristown, New Jersey on April 29, 1945. In her obituary in The New York Times, she was described as "a pioneer in the field of housing improvement." She is buried next to her husband at the United States Naval Academy Cemetery.
