= Radburn, New Jersey =

Populated place in Bergen County, New Jersey, US

- Unincorporated community
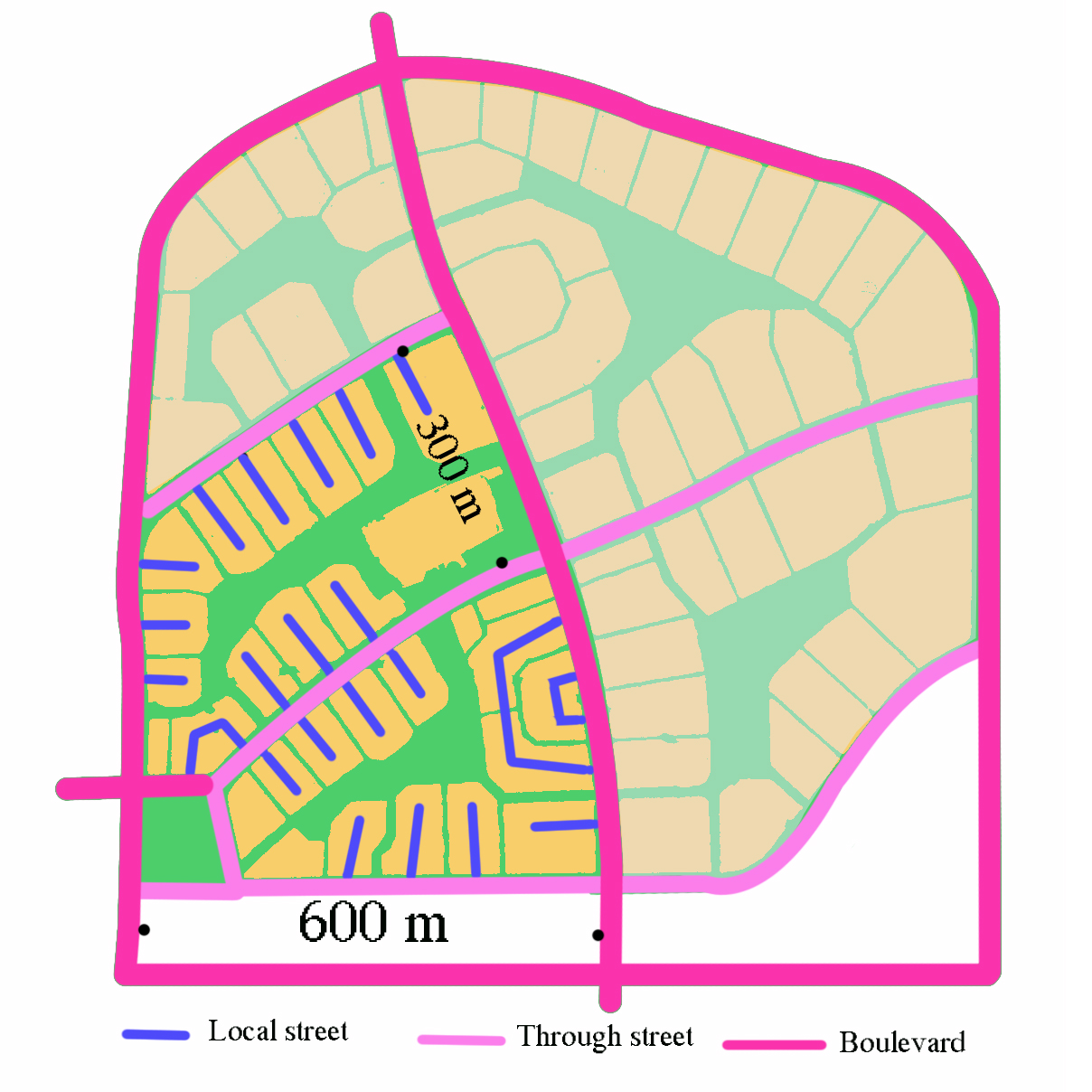
- A diagram showing the street network structure of Radburn and its nested hierarchy. Separate pedestrian paths run through the green spaces between the culs-de-sac and through the central green spine (the shaded area was not built).

- Location of Radburn in Bergen County Inset: Location of county within the state of New Jersey Radburn (New Jersey) Radburn (the United States)
- Coordinates: 40°56′33″N 74°07′00″W
- Country: United States
- State: New Jersey
- County: Bergen
- Borough: Fair Lawn
- Elevation: 95 ft (29 m)
- Time zone: UTC−05:00 (Eastern (EST))
  - Summer (DST): UTC−04:00 (EDT)
- GNIS feature ID: 879582

- Radburn
- U.S. National Register of Historic Places
- U.S. National Historic Landmark District
- New Jersey Register of Historic Places
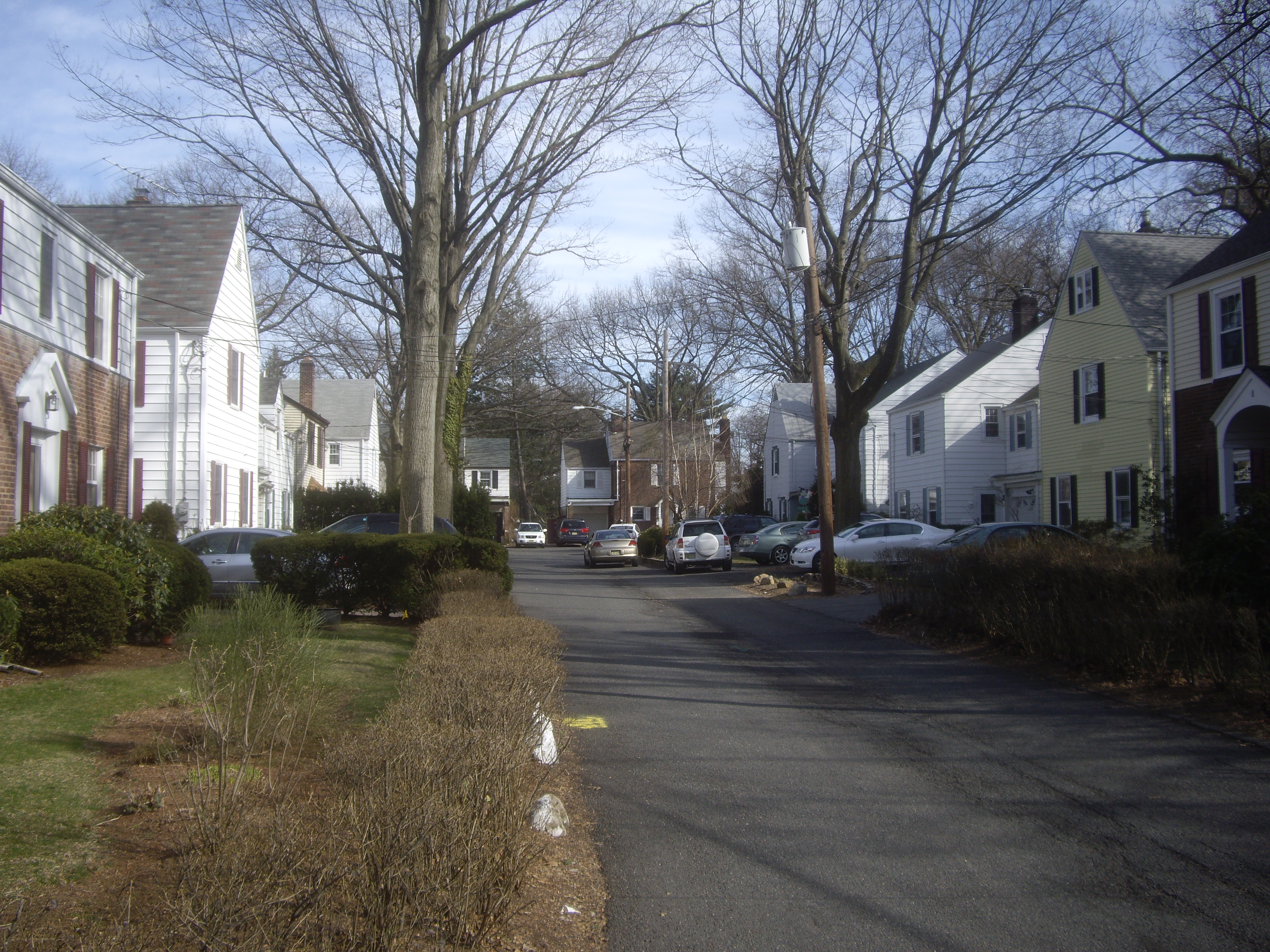
- A Radburn cul-de-sac

- Location within Bergen County, New Jersey
- Location: Fair Lawn, New Jersey
- Built: 1928
- Architects: Clarence Stein, Henry Wright
- Architectural style: Colonial Revival, Tudor Revival
- NRHP reference No.: 75001118
- NJRHP No.: 482

Significant dates
- Added to NRHP: April 16, 1975
- Designated NHLD: April 5, 2005
- Designated NJRHP: October 15, 1974

Radburn is an unincorporated community located within the borough of Fair Lawn in Bergen County, in the U.S. state of New Jersey.

Radburn was founded in 1929 as "a town for the motor age". Its planners, Clarence Stein and Henry Wright, and its landscape architect Marjorie Sewell Cautley aimed to incorporate modern planning principles, which were then being introduced into England's Garden Cities, following ideas advocated by urban planners Ebenezer Howard, Sir Patrick Geddes and Clarence Perry. Perry's neighborhood unit concept was well-formulated by the time Radburn was planned, being informed by Forest Hills Gardens, Queens, New York City (1909–1914), a garden-city development of the Russell Sage Foundation.

Radburn was explicitly designed to separate traffic by mode, with a pedestrian path system that does not cross any major roads at grade level. Radburn introduced the largely residential "superblock" and is credited with incorporating some of the earliest culs-de-sac in the United States. It was designated a National Historic Landmark District in 2005, in recognition of its history in the development of the garden city movement in the 20th century.

== Statistics ==
There are approximately 3,100 people in 670 families residing in Radburn. They live in 469 single-family homes, 48 townhouses, 30 two-family houses, and a 93-unit apartment complex. An additional 165-unit townhouse development is under construction.

Radburn's 149 acres (0.60 km^{2}) include 23 acres (93,000 m^{2}) of interior parks, four tennis courts, three baseball fields, two softball fields, two swimming pools, and an archery plaza. Young children and their parents can make use of two toddler playgroup areas, two playgrounds, and a toddler bathing pool.

There is also a community center which houses administrative offices, library, gymnasium, clubroom, pre-school, and maintenance shops.

For census purposes, Radburn is mostly a subset of Census Tract 171 in Bergen County, New Jersey.

== A community within a community ==
The Radburn Community, governed by a distinct board of directors, enjoys much autonomy within the Borough of Fair Lawn. Pursuant to enabling laws passed in the 1920s and covenants included in the original deeds for the development, the Radburn Association is a private association which is empowered to administer Radburn's common properties and to collect from the owners of properties quarterly association fees to cover the Association's maintenance and operation of communal facilities. The Association is also empowered to restrict development and decoration of Radburn properties in order to maintain a consistent "look" to the community. Use of Radburn Association facilities is limited to residents (though the parks themselves are ungated and the walkways are public property of the Borough.) Radburn's border with the rest of Fair Lawn is the Bergen County Line to the West; southeast of Fernwood Drive, Fulton Place, and Franciscan Way but northwest of Owen Avenue to the northwest; Radburn Road to the northeast; one block of Howard Avenue to the southeast; Alden Terrace to the northeast and east; one block of High Street to the South; Craig Road and its extension through Scribner Road to the East; and Berdan Avenue to the South. Radburn's other full-length east–west cross street is Fair Lawn Avenue, and its sole north–south cross street is Plaza Road.

== Governance ==
Radburn residents vote for a volunteer Board of Trustees to govern the Association. Nine board seats are open to nomination and election on a rotating schedule. Any homeowner in good standing may self-nominate, or be nominated by any other homeowner in good standing. However, this was not the case before State law was amended in July 2017.

In November 2006, a group of Radburn residents opposed to the current system of governance filed a lawsuit against the Radburn Association. The plaintiffs claim that Radburn's governance violates New Jersey state law and the New Jersey State Constitution. The residents are represented by two public interest legal organizations: the New Jersey Appleseed Public Interest Law Center and The Community Law Clinic of The Rutgers School of Law–Newark.

On April 1, 2008, the New Jersey Superior Court awarded summary judgements for both sides in the democracy lawsuit. Judge Contillo found that Radburn's governance was legal as well as its membership. The Court ordered the Association to comply with the law by providing full financial disclosure to residents and amending its bylaws to support open trustee meetings four times each year.

New Jersey Constitutional expert Frank Askin of the Rutgers University School of Law at Newark, and his Clinic on Constitutional Law, joined the plaintiffs' pro bono legal team for the appeals process, intending to affirm through the courts that the PREDFDA statute guarantees free elections in planned community government.

On June 17, 2010, the Moore v. Radburn litigation was finally put to rest by the New Jersey Supreme Court. The petition for certification filed by the 16 litigants was denied.

In July 2017, Senate bill S2492 was signed into law by Governor Chris Christie, having passed unanimously in both the Senate and Assembly. The new law guarantees membership to all homeowners in New Jersey common interest communities, and requires that self-nomination must be allowed in executive board elections. The Radburn Association voted to adopt revised by-laws at a meeting in May 2017, some of which are inconsistent with several parts of the new law and other existing statutes. The 2017 by-laws revisions were later rescinded for irregularities in their adoption.

== Facilities ==
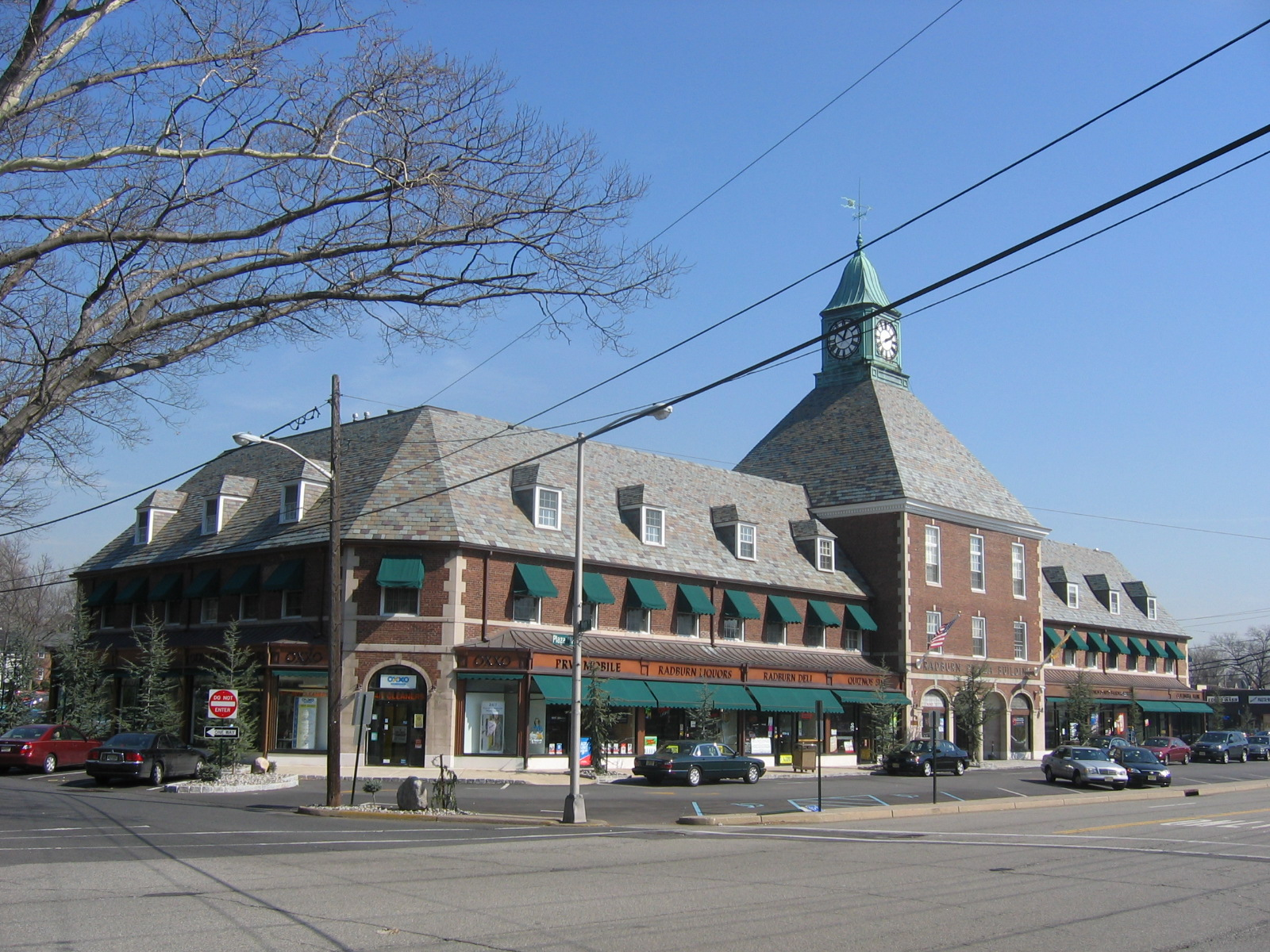
The Radburn Plaza Building.

The Radburn School, an elementary school located on the edge of the "B" park, is operated by the Fair Lawn Public Schools. While many of its students are Radburn residents, it serves a larger district. The school, built in 1929, was designed by the architecture firm of Guilbert and Betelle. The building was expanded in 1955 and again in 2005.

In 2016, the elementary school aged students of The Radburn School surpassed their fundraising goal of $60,000 through lemonade stands, rainbow bracelets sales, and a 5k race, but were denied permission to build the playground by The Radburn Association for aesthetic reasons.

Several prominent Fair Lawn businesses exist in Radburn's business district, which is at the intersection of Fair Lawn Avenue and Plaza Road, two important arteries in Fair Lawn. Many of these businesses are within the Radburn Plaza (clock tower) building, a signature landmark of Radburn and Fair Lawn itself. (The building suffered a severe fire several years ago and was recently restored in its prior image.) Nearby stands the Old Dutch House, a tavern built during the time of Dutch colonization of the Americas.

Facing the Plaza Building is the Radburn railroad station, built by the Radburn developers along the Erie Railroad line (later Conrail) and listed on the National Register of Historic Places. Passenger service operates there today on the New Jersey Transit Bergen County Line.

== Radburn Design Housing ==
The 'Radburn design' has been formalised in the Radburn design for public housing. The design has been used in the US, Canada, Australia, and the United Kingdom.

The design was an influence on Walt Disney's design for Disney World.

== Notable people ==
People who were born in, residents of, or otherwise closely associated with Radburn include:

- Steven Ehrlich (born 1946), architect who is the founding partner of the practice Ehrlich Yanai Rhee Chaney Architects, formerly known as Ehrlich Architects
- Philip Plotch (born 1961), professor, author, and urban planner.

== See also ==
- National Register of Historic Places listings in Bergen County, New Jersey
