= Torsney Playground =

Park in Queens, New York

- Interactive map of Torsney Playground
- Type: Municipal playground
- Location: Sunnyside, Queens, New York City
- Coordinates: 40.7475°N 73.9217°W
- Area: 2.03 acres (0.82 ha)
- Created: 1952
- Operator: New York City Department of Parks and Recreation
- Status: Open

Torsney Playground, also known as the Torsney/Lou Lodati Playground, is a public playground in Sunnyside, Queens. It covers about 2 acres (0.81 ha) on the north side of Skillman Avenue between 41st and 43rd Streets, near the Sunnyside Yard. The playground is operated by the New York City Department of Parks and Recreation (NYC Parks). The playground's children's play area is separately named the Lou Lodati Playground.

The city acquired the site in 1951 and named the playground in 1952 for George F. Torsney (1896–1942), a Marine veteran and Queens member of the New York State Assembly who had campaigned for more parks in Sunnyside. In 1999 the play area was additionally dedicated to Lou Lodati (1908–1996), a Sunnyside businessman and civic organizer known locally as the "Mayor of Sunnyside". The playground was rebuilt in 1985 and again in the 21st century, and a dog run developed with a local dog owners' group opened in 2013.

== Description ==
Torsney Playground occupies a roughly 2.03-acre (0.82 ha) parcel bounded by Skillman Avenue, 41st Street, and 43rd Street, a short distance north of the Long Island Rail Road's Sunnyside Yard. The city acquired the land on July 19, 1951. The park lies within Queens Community Board 2.

The grounds are divided into a children's play area and an athletic area. The play area, separately named the Lou Lodati Playground, is fitted with swings, a spray shower, benches, a comfort station, play equipment set on safety surfacing, and a flagpole topped by a yardarm. The athletic area contains handball and basketball courts, a multipurpose hard-surface area, and a fenced dog run divided into areas for larger and smaller dogs. A bronze tablet honoring Torsney is mounted on the playground house at Skillman Avenue and 41st Street, describing him as an "assemblyman, active civil worker, [and] advocate of recreational facilities for the children of Queens".

== History ==
=== Naming for George F. Torsney ===
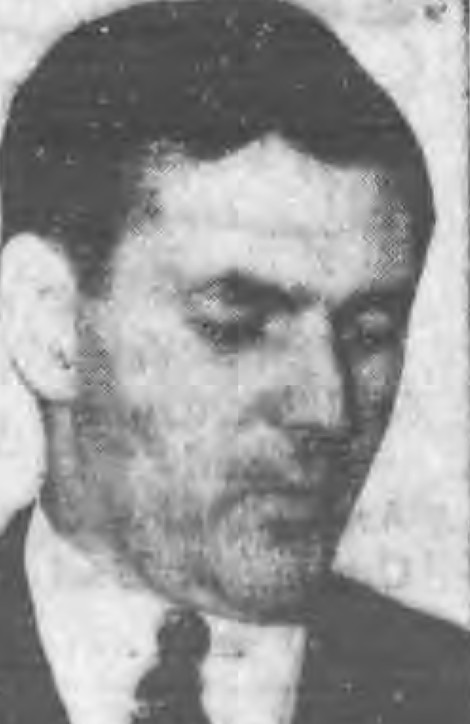
George F. Torsney (1896–1942), the state assemblyman for whom the playground was named

The Department of Parks announced the opening in 1952. The grounds were split into two halves, with the western side laid out for younger children: it held a wading pool, a jungle gym, a sand pit, a flagpole, a comfort station, and a pre-school area with benches for accompanying adults. Mayor Vincent Impellitteri signed a local law in 1952 designating the grounds the George F. Torsney Playground as a memorial to the assemblyman, and a plaque was placed in the playground in his honor.

Torsney (1896–1942) served in the Marine Corps during World War I, leaving in 1919 as a first sergeant, and afterward ran a trucking company. Elected to the State Assembly in 1932, he represented a Queens district through the 1930s and early 1940s and became a leader of the borough's legislative delegation, pressing to reapportion the state's legislative districts to better represent fast-growing Queens. During World War II he headed the Long Island City branch of the Queens Civilian Defense Volunteers. A resident of Thomson Hill, Torsney campaigned for more parks and playgrounds in Sunnyside, and in a 1941 guest editorial he decried the absence of an adequate playground there. He died on December 28, 1942, and the playground built on the Skillman Avenue site a decade later was named in his memory.

=== Lou Lodati Playground ===
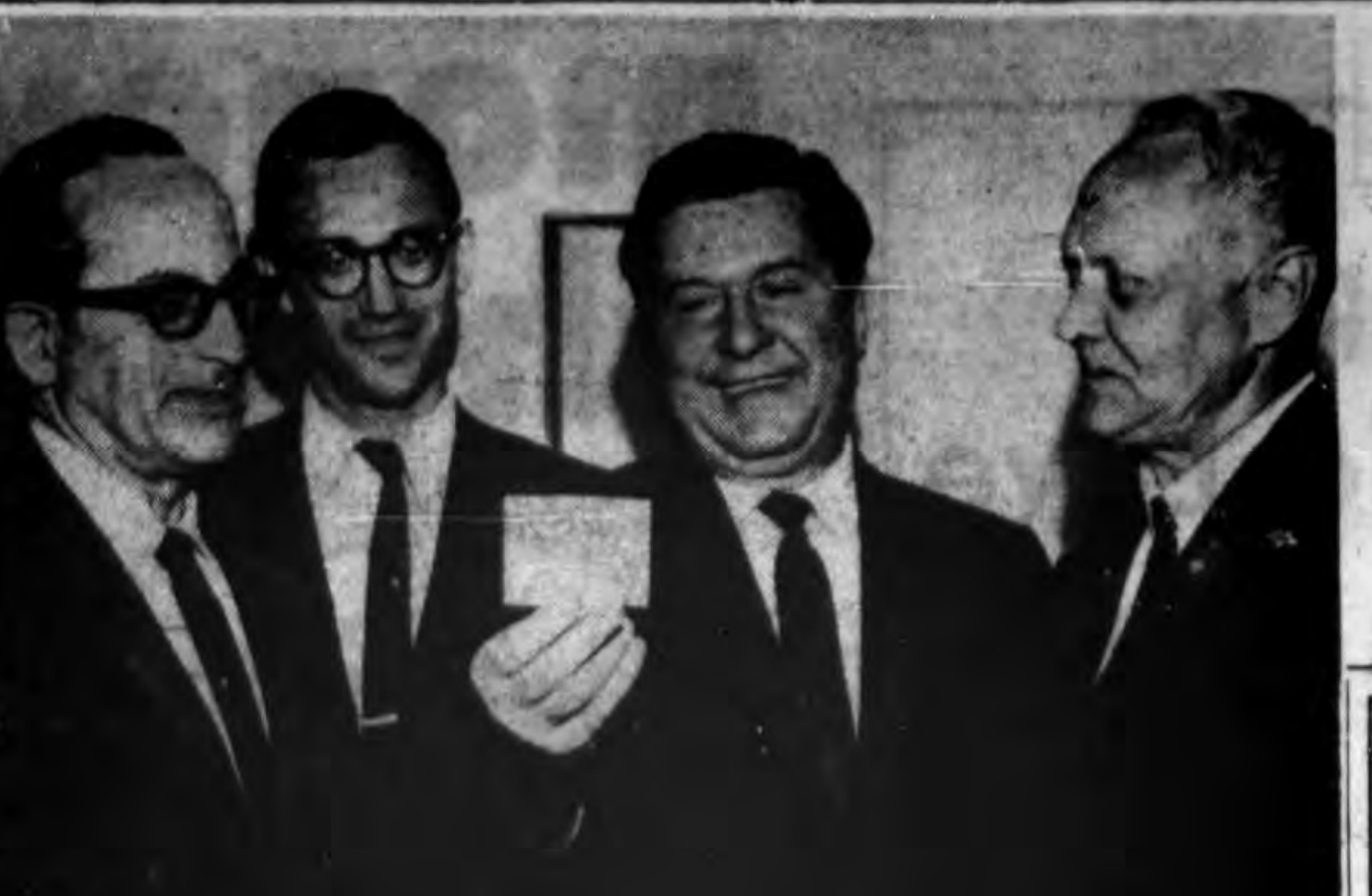
Louis Lodati (second from right) announcing a prize winner in 1967

In 1999 the New York City Council passed, and Mayor Rudy Giuliani signed on June 28, a local law that gave the play area within Torsney Playground its additional name, Lou Lodati Playground.

Lou Lodati (1908–1996) was a Sunnyside businessman and community organizer who wrote for the Woodside Herald as a young man and had the nickname "Mayor of Sunnyside". He supported the 1947 founding of the Kiwanis Club of Sunnyside. He chaired the local chapter of the American Red Cross and served as president of the Sunnyside Chamber of Commerce. By 1957 he was lieutenant governor of the Queens West division of Kiwanis International, and was honored at a testimonial dinner that year. In 1965 the Italian government awarded him the Star of Italian Solidarity, first class, for his support of an orphanage at Bari, Italy, and a dinner in his honor drew about 1,000 guests. He later chaired the Sunnyside Sales Days, a Chamber of Commerce shopping promotion. He also ran Cassel's Lounge, cooking for housebound residents and hosting free holiday meals for those without family. Lodati died in September 1996, aged 88.

=== Reconstruction and dog run ===
The grounds were rebuilt in 1985, a project that converted the wading pool into a spray shower and brought floodlighting, Belgian-block tree pits, new play equipment, and safety surfacing. A further renovation costing $678,780 followed in 1995, funded by Council Member Walter McCaffrey.

Beginning in the early 2000s, a local group called the Sunnyside United Dog Society campaigned for a dog run at the park. Community Board 2 rejected the group's initial proposals in 2004 and 2005 as too close to the children's playground, and in 2006 the board itself proposed the alternative location that became the site of the dog run. Funded with $700,000 each from Council Member Jimmy Van Bramer and Queens Borough President Helen Marshall, the resulting $1.4 million project resurfaced the sports courts and created a dog run with separate zones for larger and smaller dogs. The renovated park reopened on June 22, 2013, in a ceremony attended by about 200 people and 100 dogs. In a 2022 Gothamist reader survey of the city's dog runs, respondents praised the Torsney/Lou Lodati run, with one calling it the best in the borough.

In 2022 Council Member Julie Won allocated $6.96 million for the park's sports area, handball courts, and drainage, and the following year designated a further $7.15 million to reconstruct the Lou Lodati Playground and its dog run. The NYC Parks capital project completed its design phase in December 2025 and, as of 2026, was awaiting procurement.

== Events and community use ==
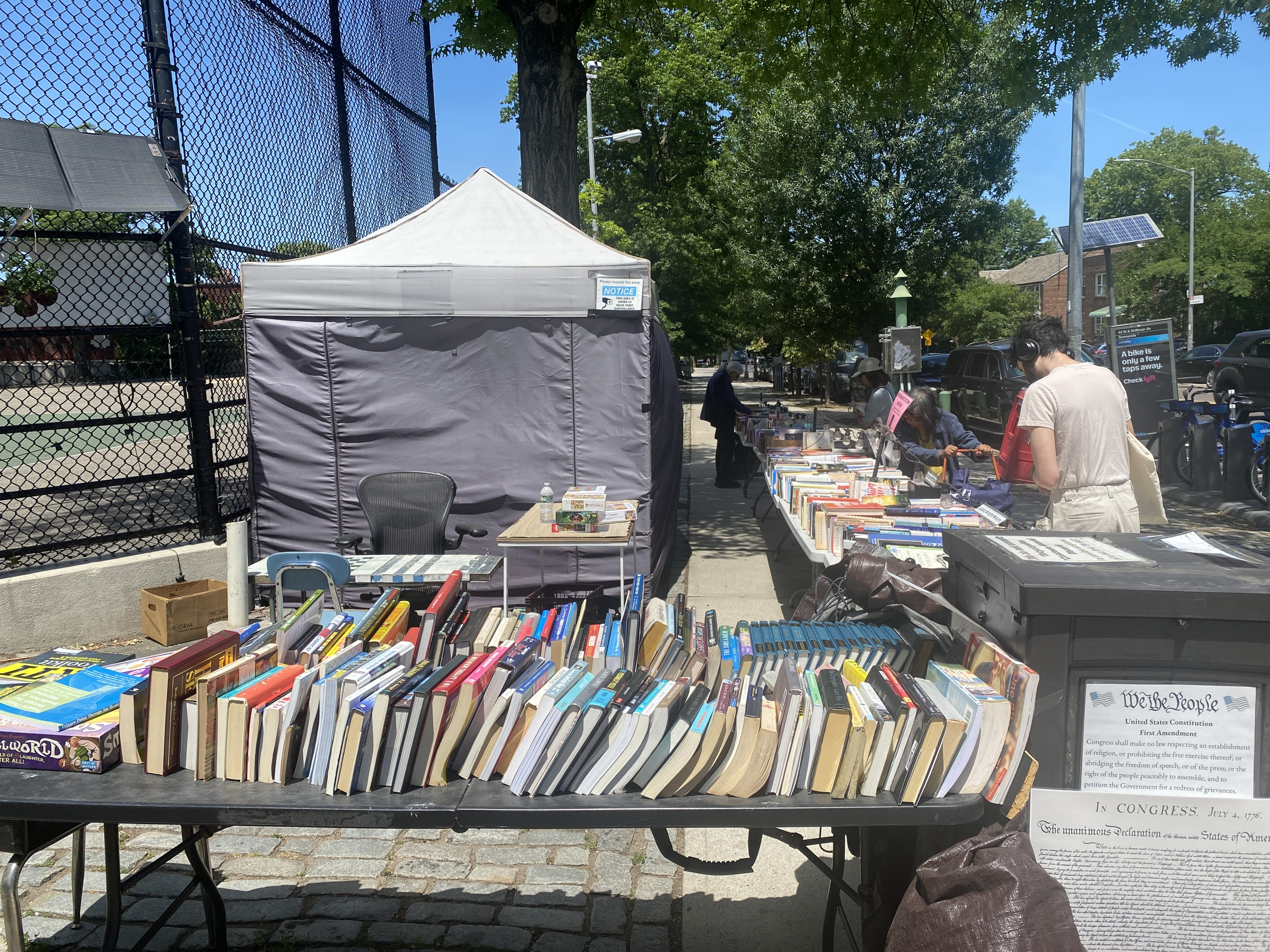
Sunnyside Book and Media Swap at the eastern edge of the park.

The playground hosts the 108th Precinct's observance of National Night Out. The Sunnyside Greenmarket, run by GrowNYC since 2007, is held on Skillman Avenue adjacent to the park. In 2020, after budget cuts to NYC Parks, a resident organized a volunteer group, the Volunteers of Torsney Lodati, to help maintain the grounds.

The Sunnyside Book and Media Swap, a free open-air book and media exchange that a resident, Volker Detering, started during the COVID-19 pandemic, has operated on an honor system at Skillman Avenue and 43rd Street since 2020. After a neighbor's complaint that year, the parks department ordered the unattended books removed, deeming them trash, but the swap continued with support from Council Member Jimmy Van Bramer and Representative Alexandria Ocasio-Cortez. By 2024 it was taking in about 30,000 donated items a month.
