= Lt. Michael R. Davidson Playground =

Playground in Sunnyside, Queens

- Interactive map of Lt. Michael R. Davidson Playground
- Type: Playground
- Location: Sunnyside, Queens, New York City
- Coordinates: 40.7487°N 73.9134°W
- Area: 0.23 acres (0.093 ha)
- Created: 2026
- Operator: New York City Department of Parks and Recreation
- Status: Open

Lt. Michael R. Davidson Playground is a 0.23-acre (0.093 ha) playground in the Sunnyside neighborhood of Queens, New York City. It occupies a lot on the south side of 39th Avenue between 50th and 51st Streets, within the Sunnyside Gardens Historic District. Operated by the New York City Department of Parks and Recreation (NYC Parks), it is named for Michael R. Davidson (1981–2018), a New York City Fire Department (FDNY) firefighter who grew up in the nearby Phipps Garden Apartments and died fighting a fire in Harlem.

The lot was a private playground for children of the Phipps Garden Apartments from the 1930s until the playground closed in the early 1990s. After Phipps sold the site to a developer in 2007, a 2013 proposal to build an eight-unit apartment building there and to reassemble the Aluminaire House (an architecturally significant 1931 metal prototype house) on the lot drew opposition from residents, preservationists, and elected officials and was rejected by the New York City Landmarks Preservation Commission (LPC). The city acquired the site for a public park in 2019, and a neighborhood campaign had it named for Davidson, who had played on the lot as a child. The playground opened on June 18, 2026.

== Description ==
The playground occupies a 0.23-acre (0.093 ha) lot at 39th Avenue between 50th and 51st Streets in Sunnyside, within the Sunnyside Gardens Historic District and across 39th Avenue from the Phipps Garden Apartments. It has firefighter-themed play equipment and play panels honoring Davidson, play areas for younger and older children (ages two to five and five to twelve), and a water-play area with vertical and in-ground spray features. A commemorative flagpole with a bronze plaque to Davidson stands at an expanded entrance, and a seating area runs along 39th Avenue. Two structures that survived from the 1930s playground were restored in the project: a pavilion, which holds game and picnic tables, and a shed, which was converted into a public restroom.

== History ==
=== Phipps playground ===
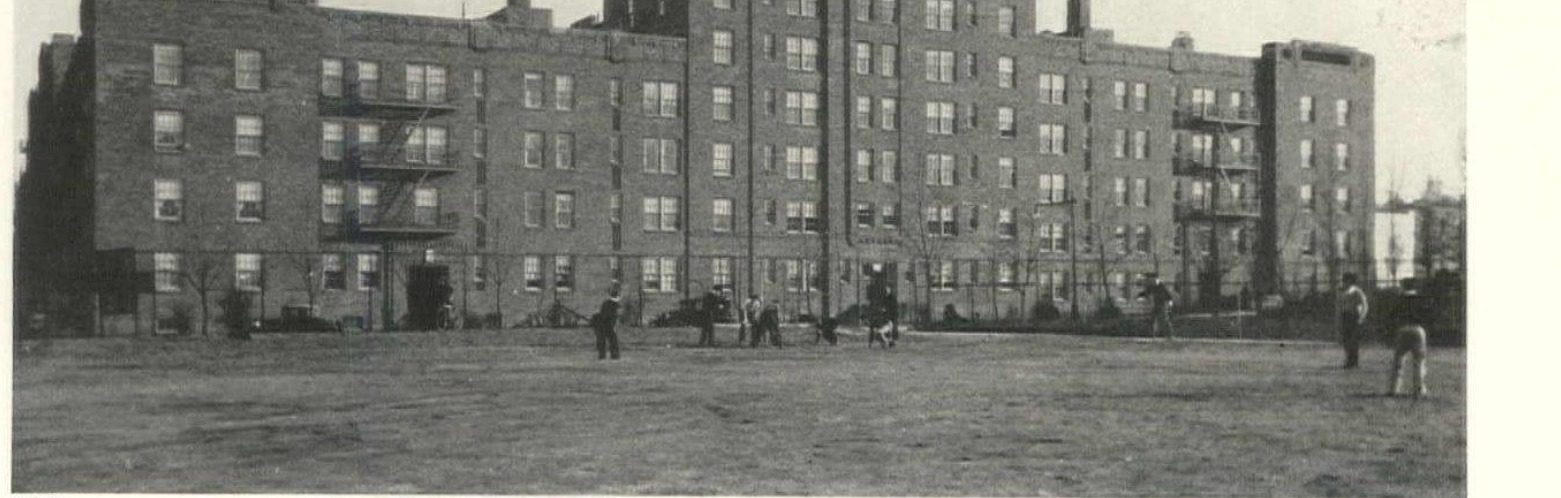
The playground in 1932, looking across the play field toward the Phipps Garden Apartments. The lot is now Davidson Playground.

The lot was set aside in the 1930s as a private outdoor playground, sometimes called the Phipps Outdoor Nursery, for children of the adjacent Phipps Garden Apartments, a moderate-income housing complex that Phipps Houses had built across 39th Avenue. The quarter-acre space was laid out as a dedicated play area for small children, with sightlines that let parents watch from nearby, in keeping with the philosophy of landscape architect Marjorie Sewell Cautley, who designed the open spaces of Sunnyside Gardens. Its features included a large wooden shade pavilion, a small children's playhouse, steel play equipment, and mature shade trees. The playground closed in the early 1990s and fell into disuse, though remnants such as the pavilion, shed, and old swings remained. Local coverage described it as one of the last surviving Depression-era playgrounds in the city.

=== Aluminaire House proposal ===
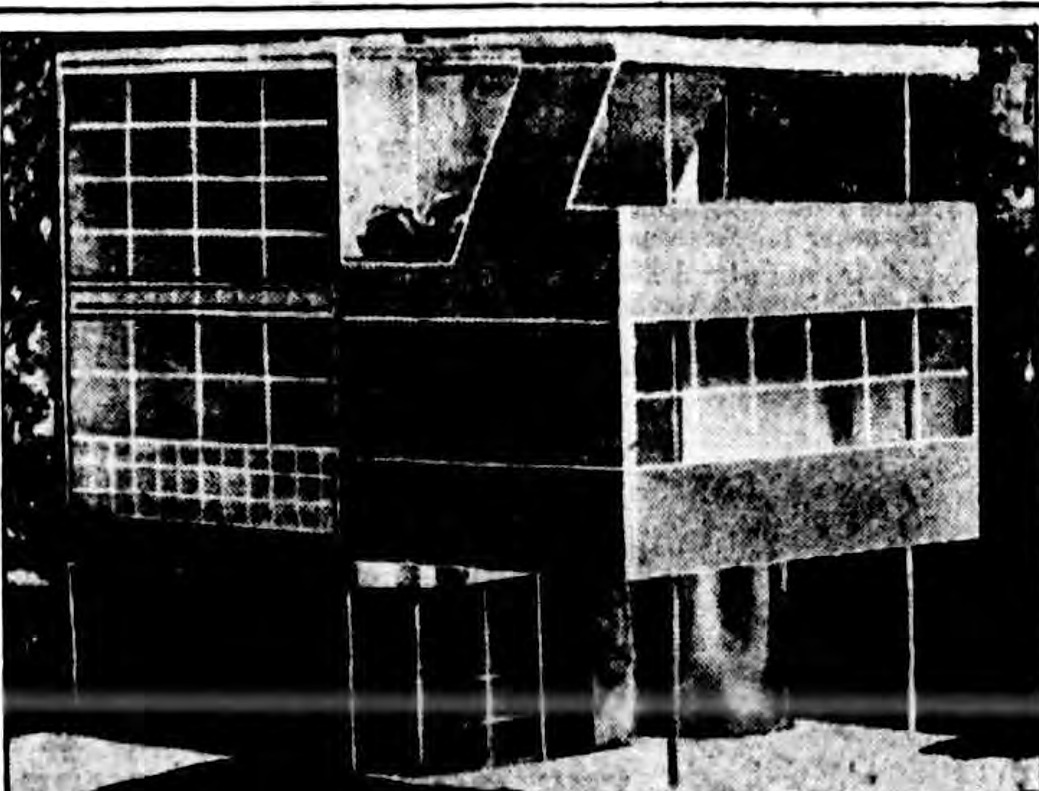
The Aluminaire House at its 1931 exhibition debut in New York

Phipps sold the lot in 2007 to DBH Associates, a development company. In 2013, DBH and the architects Michael Schwarting and Frances Campani, whose foundation owned the Aluminaire House, proposed building a two-story, eight-unit apartment building on the lot and reassembling the Aluminaire House in front of it, to be run as a small private museum. Designed by A. Lawrence Kocher and Albert Frey and built as a model for a 1931 architectural exhibition in New York, the 1,200-square-foot (110 m^{2}) Aluminaire House was the first all-metal prefabricated house built in the United States; the architecture critic Paul Goldberger had called it one of "the pivotal works of modern architecture in America". It had most recently stood at the New York Institute of Technology on Long Island and had been disassembled and placed in storage in 2012.

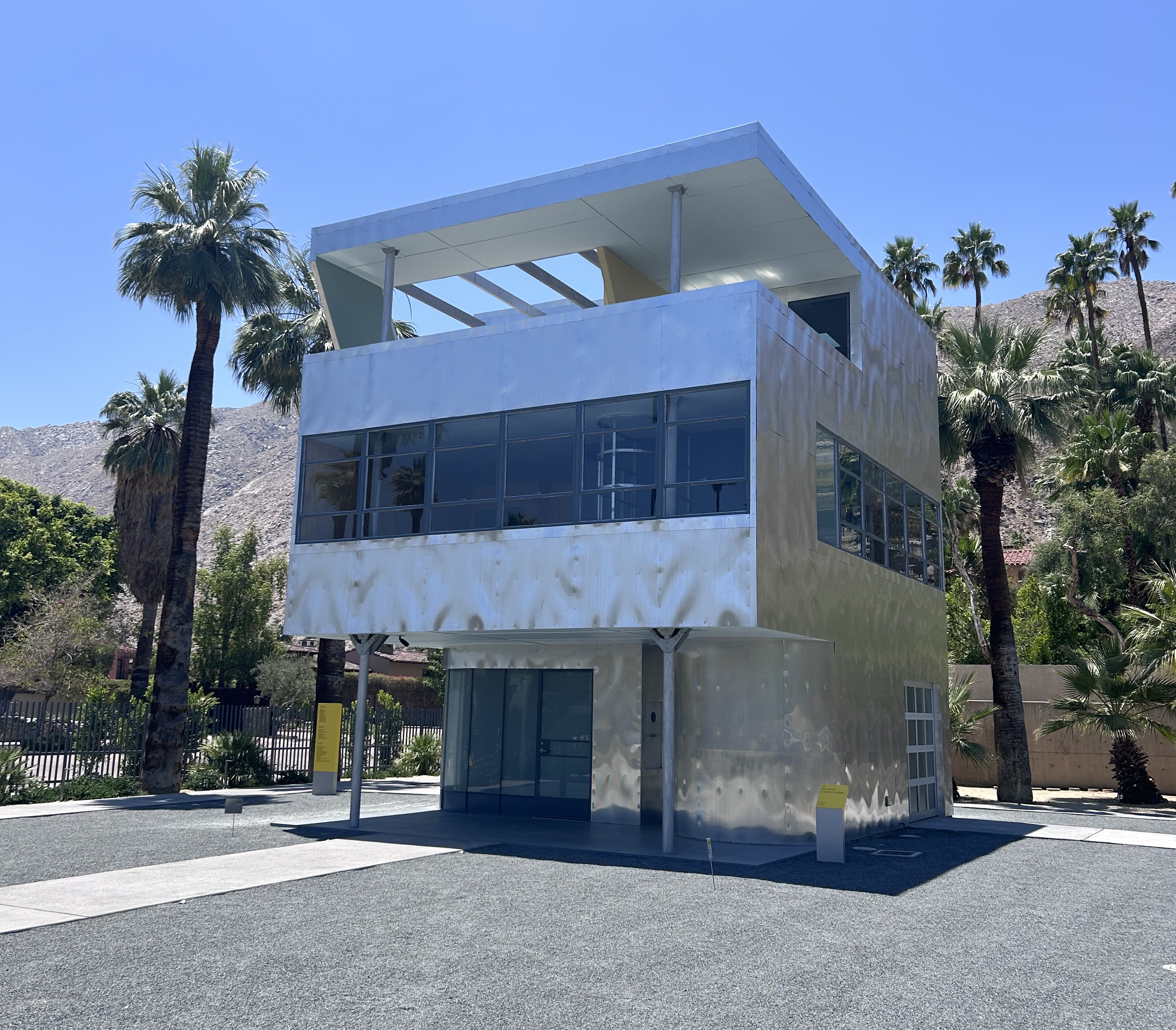
The Aluminaire House in 2025, reassembled at the Palm Springs Art Museum

Many residents objected that the metal house and the apartment building were out of character with the red-brick row houses of the historic district. Community Board 2 voted against the plan, and opponents included preservation groups such as the Historic Districts Council and the Sunnyside Gardens Preservation Alliance. Elected officials who opposed it included City Council member Jimmy Van Bramer, State Senator Michael Gianaris, and Assembly member Margaret Markey. At an LPC public hearing on October 15, 2013, about 40 of the 54 people who testified spoke against the proposal. The following January, the commission declined to approve the application, ending the plan. The Aluminaire House was later donated to the Palm Springs Art Museum in California, where it was reassembled and opened to the public in 2024.

=== Acquisition and naming ===
As the development plan collapsed, Van Bramer led an effort to have the city buy the lot for a public park, an initiative endorsed by U.S. Representative Joseph Crowley, Gianaris, Markey, Community Board 2, and Queens Borough President Melinda Katz. He secured about $2 million toward the purchase, along with funding for renovation, and the city formally acquired the lot from DBH in September 2019.

On March 23, 2018, Davidson, who had grown up in the Phipps Garden Apartments across the street and had played on the lot as a boy, died fighting a five-alarm fire in Harlem. The Friends of the Michael Davidson Playground, a neighborhood group, gathered almost 4,000 signatures on a petition to name the future park for him, according to the group. The site was dedicated in his honor on October 30, 2019, at a ceremony attended by Van Bramer, Fire Commissioner Daniel Nigro, and Parks Commissioner Mitchell Silver.

=== Design and opening ===
Following a scoping meeting held in December 2020, NYC Parks released a preliminary design in June 2021. The design retained and restored the 1930s pavilion and shed and added the firefighter theme, the age-divided play areas, the water-play area, and a bronze plaque to Davidson at the base of a flagpole. The project, which had been delayed by the COVID-19 pandemic, broke ground on April 21, 2025, at a ceremony attended by Parks Commissioner Sue Donoghue, Queens Borough President Donovan Richards, City Council member Julie Won, Fire Commissioner Robert Tucker, and Davidson's brother, Eric. The finished playground, a $5.1 million project paid for by the City Council and the mayor's office, opened with a ribbon-cutting on June 18, 2026.

== Namesake ==
Michael R. Davidson (born January 24, 1981) grew up in the Phipps Garden Apartments in Sunnyside and was a second-generation firefighter. He joined the FDNY in 2003 and served all 15 years of his career at Engine Company 69 in Harlem, the firehouse where his father had served for 26 years, and was cited for bravery four times. On the night of March 22–23, 2018, his unit responded to a fire in the cellar of a five-story building at 773 St. Nicholas Avenue in Harlem, then in use as a set for the film Motherless Brooklyn. Assigned to the hose nozzle, Davidson became separated from the other firefighters and died of his injuries. He was the 1,150th FDNY member to die in the line of duty and was survived by his wife and four children. He was posthumously promoted to lieutenant. Fire marshals attributed the blaze to a boiler flue pipe that ignited combustible materials in the unsprinklered cellar. His death prompted the City Council to pass new fire-safety laws for film sets.
