= Mimar Sinan Mosque, Sunnyside =

Mosque in Sunnyside, New York City, United States

Coordinates: 40°44′47″N 73°55′07″W

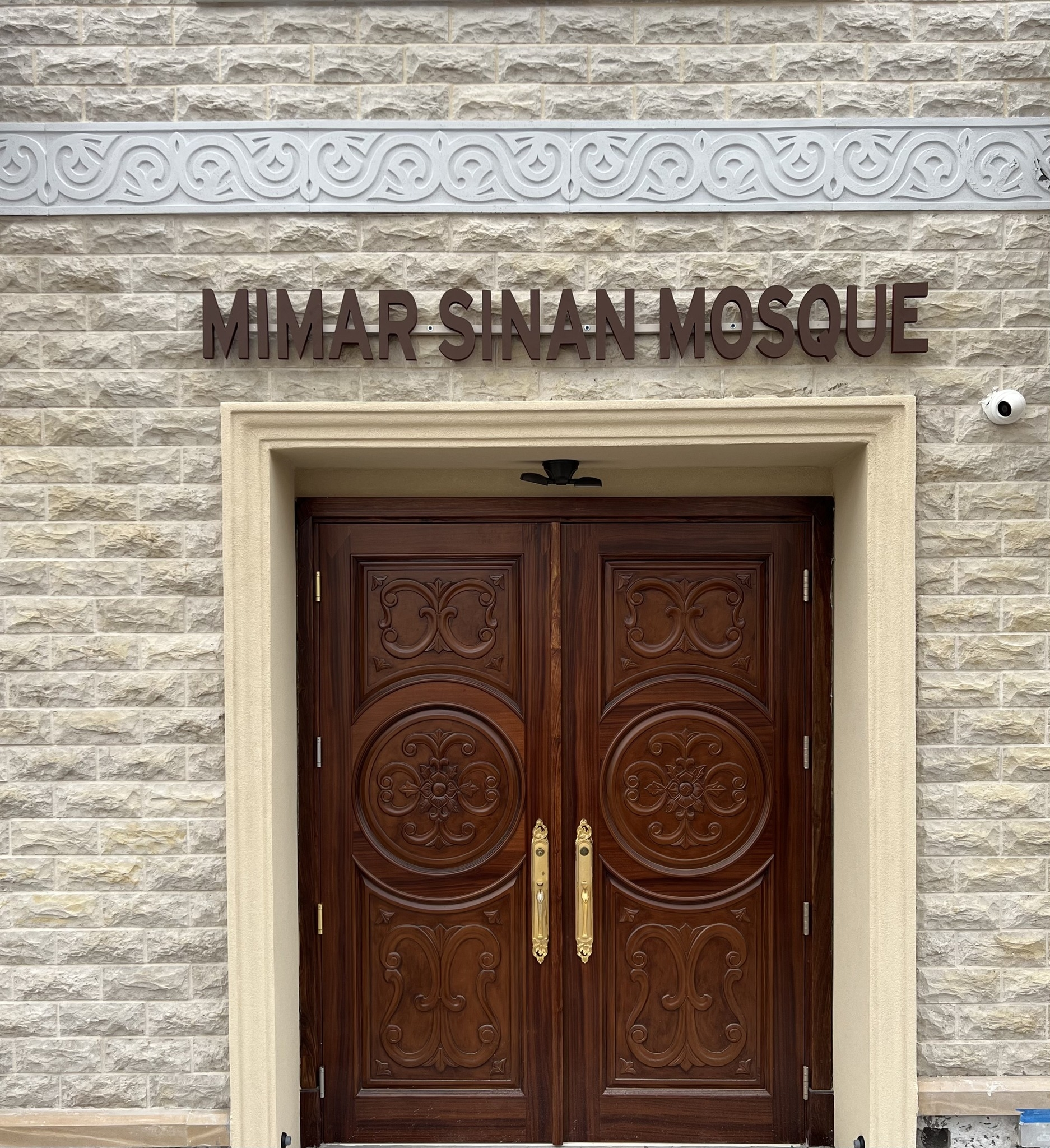
Entrance to the Mimar Sinan Mosque, located at 45-06 Skillman Ave, Sunnyside, NY 11104.

The Mimar Sinan Mosque, also known as the Turkish Islamic Cultural Center, is a mosque in Sunnyside, Queens, New York City, United States. It is located at 45-06 Skillman Avenue. The Mimar Sinan Mosque in Sunnyside serves as a prayer space, weekend school for children, and primary site for community gatherings. The mosque holds religious services such as marriages, funerals, and holiday programs, drawing large crowds during Ramadan, Eid-al-Fitr, and Eid-al-Adha. It is a well-recognized institution that provides consistent service to thousands of people every month.

== History ==
=== Early Turkish settlement in Sunnyside ===
The Mimar Sinan Mosque in Sunnyside was founded in 1990 as a result of demographic and institutional developments within the Turkish American community in late 20th-century New York. Turkish immigration to the United States began to grow around the 1960s, and the strongest Turkish American communities in New York City had formed in Sunnyside by the 1980s.

=== Establishment of the mosque ===
Turkish Muslim families who settled in Sunnyside initially organized prayer gatherings and social events in basements and rented spaces. As the community grew, members recognized the need for a more centralized religious space and purchased a two-family house at 45-06 Skillman Avenue. This building became the early home of the Mimar Sinan Mosque, named after the renowned 16th-century Ottoman architect, Mimar Sinan. According to one of the community leaders, the mosque was envisioned also to help shape the education of Turkish-American children by teaching academic subjects together with Islam.

== Institutional connections and affiliations ==
The Mimar Sinan Mosque played a similar role to other Turkish mosques in the New York metropolitan area, connecting with institutions such as the Selimiye Mosque in New Jersey and the Fatih Mosque in Brooklyn, establishing a regional network of Turkish Islamic cultural centers. Mimar Sinan is classified as a Diyanet Mosque, meaning it is affiliated with the Turkish General Directorate for Religious Affairs, founded in 1924 to administer Sunni Islamic religious services in the country. The Directorate appointed imams to 12 Turkish mosques in the United States, including Mimar Sinan, as of 2009.
