= Phipps Garden Apartments =

Apartment complex in Queens, New York

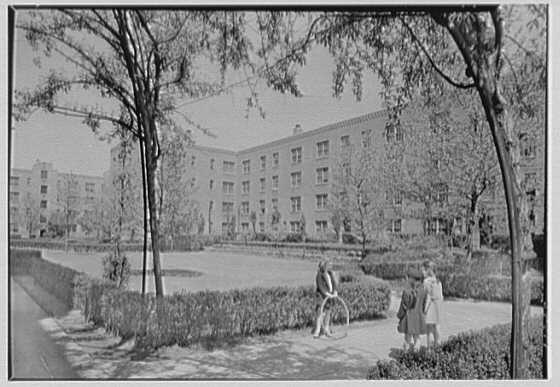
- An interior courtyard, photographed in 1940

General information
- Location: Sunnyside, Queens, New York City, 51-01 39th Avenue
- Coordinates: 40°44′57″N 73°54′46″W
- Construction started: 1931
- Completed: 1935
- Owner: Phipps Houses

Technical details
- Material: Face brick
- Floor count: 4 and 6

Design and construction
- Architect: Clarence Stein

Other information
- Number of units: 472
- Phipps Garden Apartments
- U.S. Historic district – Contributing property
- Part of: Sunnyside Gardens Historic District (ID84002919)

Phipps Garden Apartments is an affordable apartment complex in Sunnyside, Queens, New York City. It was built by the Society of Phipps Houses, a model-tenement philanthropy, on land at the northeastern edge of the Sunnyside Gardens development. The complex was built in two phases, in 1931–1932 and 1935, and contains 472 apartments arranged in two groups of buildings around landscaped interior courts.

The architect Clarence Stein, who had planned the adjacent Sunnyside Gardens, designed the complex, and the landscape architect Marjorie Sewell Cautley laid out the gardens. Because the developers were able to close a city street, which had not been permitted elsewhere in Sunnyside Gardens, Stein could group the buildings around a single large court. The first group combines six-story elevator buildings with four-story walk-ups in a hollow square; the second is built entirely of four-story walk-ups around open courts facing the first.

Phipps Houses, founded in the 1900s by the steel magnate Henry Phipps to build model tenements, built the Sunnyside complex as its first new development since 1912. The buildings are contributing properties within the Sunnyside Gardens Historic District, which was listed on the National Register of Historic Places in 1984 and designated a New York City historic district in 2007.

== Background ==
The Society of Phipps Houses was founded by the steel magnate Henry Phipps, who had owned the Carnegie Company with Andrew Carnegie until the partners sold it to J. P. Morgan in 1901. Phipps set aside a $1 million fund to build model tenements for working-class New Yorkers, seeking a return of four percent to show that decent housing could be built profitably. Its first buildings, three six-story tenements on East 31st Street in Manhattan, opened in 1906. The Museum of the City of New York describes Phipps Houses as "the oldest non-profit developer of affordable housing".

After completing several Manhattan projects between 1906 and 1912, Phipps Houses did not build again until 1931. Whereas its earlier developments had tried to address inner-city tenement conditions, the Sunnyside development was conceived to draw tenants to a new environment outside the city. The land had been assembled in the 1920s by the City Housing Corporation, the limited-dividend company that built Sunnyside Gardens between 1924 and 1928. The corporation had laid out the area for low-rise development of primarily single-family houses but found the blocks farthest from the subway uneconomic to develop that way; it sold them to Phipps Houses, whose architect determined that an apartment house could succeed there despite the distance. Phipps planned the development for white-collar clerical workers rather than the manual workers of its Manhattan tenements, and so designed larger apartments and courts than those earlier buildings. The project was organized as limited-dividend "social housing," built to return six percent to its investors.

== Design and construction ==
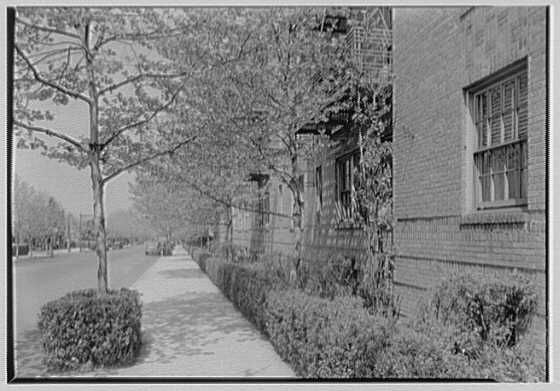
The first group's south facade and street trees in 1940

Stein was the architect of the apartments. Isadore Rosenfield, of his office, wrote the project's detailed published account, and the City Housing Corporation's building organization served as contractor. Announcing the project in January 1931, Phipps Houses said it was speeding construction to provide work during the Great Depression. The first group was built in 1931–1932 and the second in 1935.

At Sunnyside Gardens the Queens borough engineer had required the designers to keep to the existing street grid, but a few short streets near the railroad had been allowed to close, including at the Phipps site. The city vacated 51st Street through the property, creating a superblock about 460 by 400 feet. In 1933 the Regional Plan Association named the Phipps Garden Apartments, along with Manhattan's Knickerbocker Village, projects of "special significance" for having closed streets to allow better site planning. Rather than develop the whole superblock at once, Phipps Houses built the first group on the southern 260 feet, leaving the northern part for the second group. Although its buildings covered about 43 percent of the site, Stein wrote that the design kept "a real sense of openness."

== Architecture ==
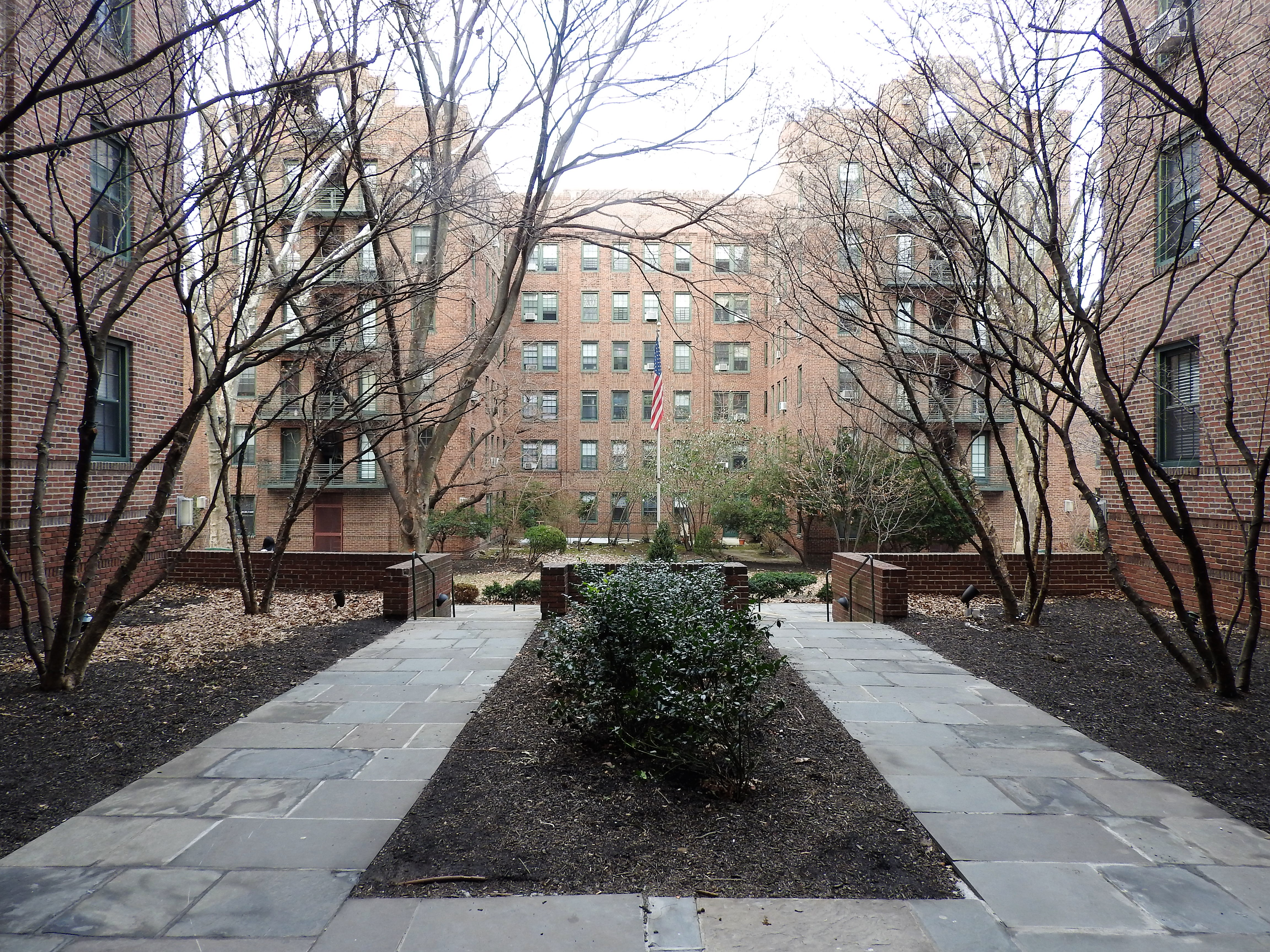
The central garden court, looking north (2018)

The first group (1931–1932) consists of six six-story elevator buildings and sixteen four-story walk-ups, all attached and forming a hollow square around the main court; it contains 344 apartments. Because New York law allowed semi-fireproof construction only up to six stories, and because demand for walk-ups fell off above four stories, the design settled on four-story walk-ups and six-story elevator buildings. To make the push-button elevators pay, Stein and Rosenfield calculated that each should serve about a hundred rooms, which led them to cluster apartments in T-shaped units. Rosenfield wrote that the projecting stems of these units broke up the long facades and gave the court "a great deal of interest," keeping it from appearing monotonous. To preserve cross-ventilation, no apartment was more than two rooms deep, and units were made deeper than at Sunnyside Gardens so that kitchens were large enough to dine in. Apartments ranged from one and a half to five rooms, many with porches, and were fitted with mechanical refrigeration and incinerators. A nursery school and a community room occupied the lower levels of the buildings, and a central six-story building had a tunnel entrance leading into the great court, with a pergola atop its roof.

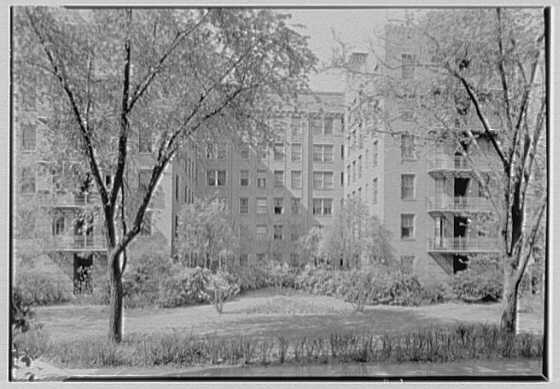
The first group's main garden court in 1940

For the Phipps buildings Stein used decorative face brick of varied colors, laid in a variety of patterns, in place of the plain Hudson River brick of Sunnyside Gardens. The Landmarks Preservation Commission's designation report likened the result to the modern housing built in Germany and the Netherlands in the 1910s and 1920s. The critic Paul Goldberger later called Phipps "a more elegant stepchild of Sunnyside," noting its more varied architecture and Art Deco brickwork, while Stein himself came to feel he had been "somewhat too exuberant in the use of brick pattern." In 1933, Phipps was among the developments shown in "The Planned Community," an exhibition by the American Institute of Architects' housing committee, which Stein chaired.

Phipps Houses built the second group in 1935 on the remaining northern part of the site. Drawing on experience at the first complex and at his Hillside Homes project, Stein built it entirely of four-story walk-ups, with no elevators, and made it fully fireproof, which allowed him to omit the exterior fire escapes the first group had required. Its buildings form a series of open courts facing the first complex, each with its own garden, rather than a single enclosed square, and it included many small apartments suited to single people and the elderly. Together the two groups contain 472 apartments.

== Landscape ==
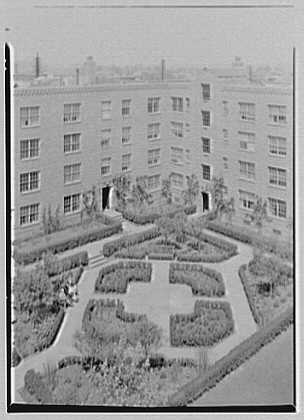
The second group's formal garden court from above in 1940

Marjorie Sewell Cautley, a Cornell University–trained landscape architect who had also designed the landscapes at Sunnyside Gardens and Radburn, New Jersey, laid out the planting for the Phipps courts. The main court was intended, in Stein's words, "as a place of restful natural beauty, as a park, not a playground". It was planted with trees, shrubs, and walkways and watered by a sprinkler system fed by a private well drilled on the property as insurance against city water shortages. With the Phipps family's approval, the project spent $2,900 on six large elm trees, which Cautley had moved in before the buildings were finished. She laid out the first court with formal Dutch and English gardens at its ends and a simpler picturesque garden between them. When the second group was added in 1935 over former tennis courts, Cautley gave its courts three gardens, with a wisteria arbor marking the way from the original court and ginkgo trees espaliered against the walls. The buildings covered less than half of the site as much of the site was used for landscaping, and most ground-floor apartments opened onto small private gardens.

For recreation, residents had the use of the adjacent Sunnyside Gardens Park, and many of the Phipps families joined its community association. Phipps Houses also bought a lot across 39th Avenue, where Cautley laid out a children's playground with a sandbox pavilion and a wading pool. The playground was later closed in the 1990s, and Phipps sold the lot to a developer in 2007. A 2013 proposal to redevelop the site with an eight-unit apartment building incorporating the Aluminaire House (an architecturally significant 1931 aluminum-clad prefabricated model house) drew opposition from local residents and preservationists as out of character with the historic district and did not proceed. In 2019 the city acquired the lot for a public playground, named the Lt. Michael R. Davidson Playground. The playground opened in 2026.

== Later history ==
Within months of the first group's opening in the fall of 1931, more than 200 of its 344 apartments were occupied. To keep units within reach of working-class tenants, the Society offered rent discounts for two- and three-year leases; by 1932 about ninety percent of the apartments were under such leases. In 1933, it cut rents, citing a policy of passing lower operating costs on to tenants. Stein wrote in 1951 that the apartments had been almost fully occupied for nineteen years. On the complex's fortieth anniversary in 1971, the rent-controlled apartments rented for about $25 a room, and the waiting list held some 2,500 names, with only about two percent of apartments turning over each year. Then-president of Phipps Houses Duncan Elder said Phipps was working to increase the share of Black tenants by admitting a Black family for every white family. By the early 1980s some apartments rented for as little as $200 a month, with a waiting list that could take as long as seven years.

Phipps Houses continued to expand as a nonprofit affordable-housing developer, owning and managing several thousand apartments across the city by the early 2000s. It still owns and operates the complex, which it markets as the Sunnyside Gardens Apartments. Phipps Houses also pursued a new affordable building on its adjacent parking lot at 50-25 Barnett Avenue. A ten-story, 208-unit proposal was effectively defeated in 2016, when the local council member, Jimmy Van Bramer, said he would block the rezoning, calling the building too large for the neighborhood. A smaller plan won unanimous City Council approval in 2021, despite continued opposition from some tenants and neighbors. The completed building, an eight-story development named the Barnett, opened an affordable-housing lottery for 146 units in 2026.

== Landmark designation ==
The Phipps Garden Apartments are contributing properties within the Sunnyside Gardens Historic District. The district was added to the National Register of Historic Places on September 7, 1984. On June 26, 2007, the New York City Landmarks Preservation Commission designated it a New York City historic district; the designation includes the two Phipps complexes and the separate park built for Phipps residents (now Lt. Michael R. Davidson Playground).

== Bibliography ==
- Rosenfield, Isadore (February 1932). "Phipps Garden Apartments". Architectural Forum. 56 (2): 111–124, 183–187.
- Stein, Clarence S. (1951). Toward New Towns for America. Liverpool: University Press of Liverpool. OCLC 1086554.
- Larsen, Kristin E. (2016). Community Architect: The Life and Vision of Clarence S. Stein. Ithaca: Cornell University Press. ISBN 978-1-5017-0246-4.
- Way, Thaisa (2005). "Designing Garden City Landscapes: Works by Marjorie L. Sewell Cautley, 1922–1937". Studies in the History of Gardens & Designed Landscapes. 25 (4): 297–316. doi:10.1080/14601176.2005.10435449.
- Kurshan, Virginia; Harrison, Tara; Horak, Kathryn E. (June 26, 2007). Sunnyside Gardens Historic District Designation Report (PDF) (Report). New York City Landmarks Preservation Commission. LP-2258.
