= Sunnyside, Queens =

Neighborhood in New York City

Coordinates: 40.743°N 73.920°W

Sunnyside
- Neighborhood of Queens
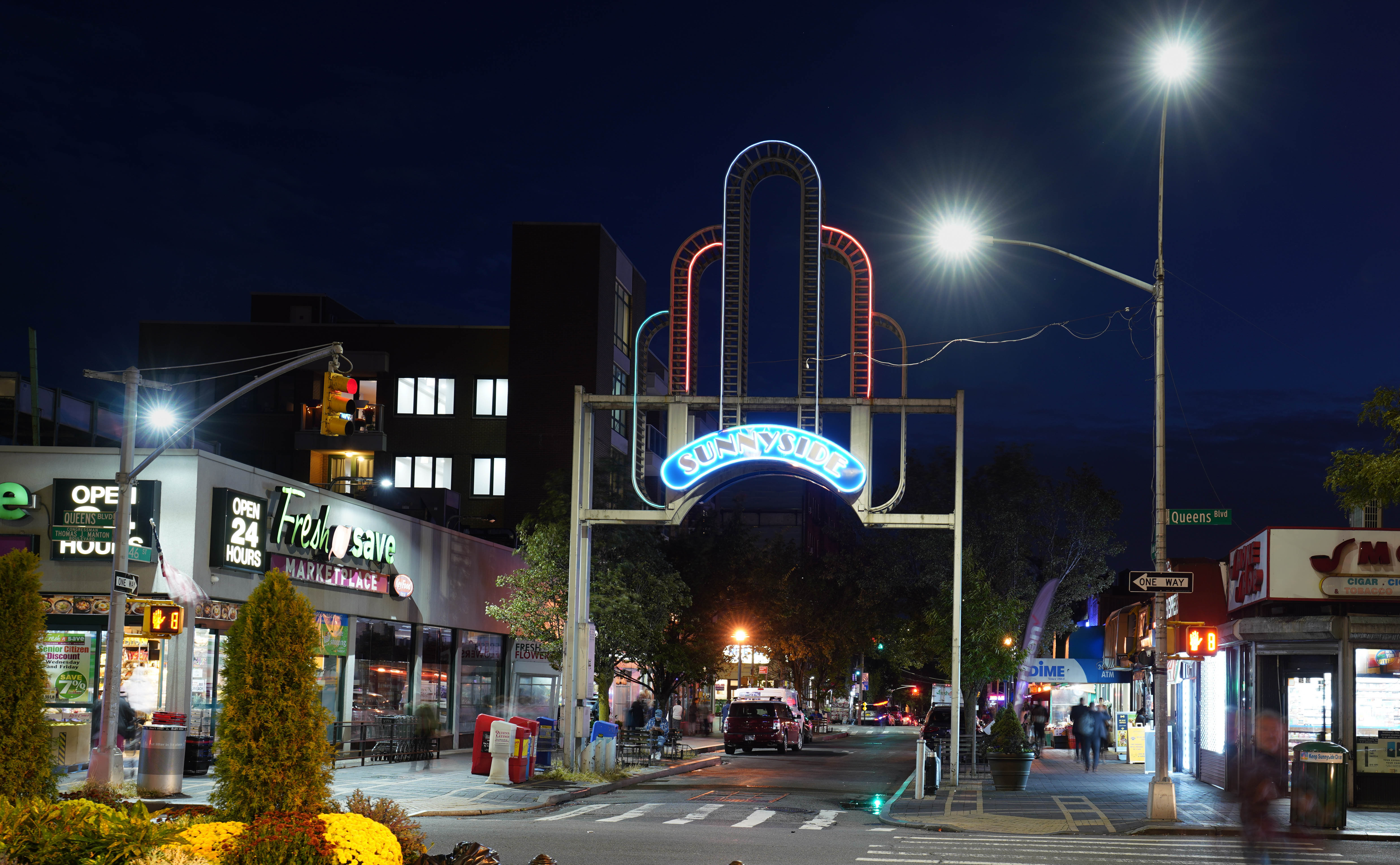
- The Sunnyside Arch, a neighborhood landmark, over 46th Street at Queens Boulevard
- Interactive map of Sunnyside
- Country: United States
- State: New York
- City: New York City
- County/Borough: Queens
- Community District: Queens 2
- Named for: "Sunnyside Hill," the Bragaw family estate at Dutch Kills

Population
  - Total: 52,278
- Time zone: UTC−05:00 (EST)
  - Summer (DST): UTC−04:00 (EDT)
- ZIP codes: 11101, 11104, 11377
- Area codes: 718, 347, 929, and 917

Sunnyside is a neighborhood in the western portion of the New York City borough of Queens. It is bounded by Hunters Point and Long Island City to the west, Astoria to the north, Woodside to the east, and Maspeth and Newtown Creek to the south. The Sunnyside Yard rail complex separates the neighborhood from Astoria along its northern boundary, and the Brooklyn–Queens Expressway forms part of its southern edge.

The area developed as a residential bedroom community in the years after the Queensboro Bridge opened in 1909 and the Flushing Line subway reached Queens in 1917. Most of the neighborhood was built up between the early 1920s and the late 1930s. North of Queens Boulevard, the planned community of Sunnyside Gardens was constructed between 1924 and 1928 as one of the first applications of the garden-city model in the United States; it was listed on the National Register of Historic Places in 1984 and designated a New York City historic district in 2007. Sunnyside is served by the 7 train subway and is along the route of the annual St. Pat's for All parade.

Sunnyside is located in Queens Community District 2, and its ZIP codes are 11101, 11104, and 11377. It is patrolled by the New York City Police Department's 108th Precinct. Politically, Sunnyside is represented by the New York City Council's 26th District.

== Geography ==
The neighborhood is located in western Queens. It is bounded by the Long Island Rail Road Main Line and Sunnyside Yard to the north and by the Brooklyn–Queens Expressway and Newtown Creek to the south. Sources differ on the neighborhood's eastern and western extent; for example, The Encyclopedia of New York City gives Van Dam Street as the western boundary and Calvary Cemetery and 51st Street as the eastern boundary, whereas a New York Times article gives boundaries at 39th Street to the west, and to the east by 48th Street south of Queens Boulevard and 52nd Street north of Queens Boulevard. The Department of City Planning's 2020 Neighborhood Tabulation Area (NTA) for Sunnyside occupies approximately 1,095 acres (443 ha).

Queens Boulevard runs through the middle of Sunnyside on a southwest-to-northeast diagonal and divides the neighborhood into two distinct residential areas. North of Queens Boulevard lies the Sunnyside Gardens historic district, a planned community of brick rowhouses and small apartment buildings constructed between 1924 and 1928. South of Queens Boulevard includes prewar apartment buildings as well some houses, and residences south of Queens Boulevard tend to be larger and less expensive than residences north of it. Queens Boulevard also marks the boundary between New York City Community School Districts 30 and 24.

Sunnyside Yard, a 192-acre (78 ha) rail yard built by the Pennsylvania Railroad and opened in 1910, occupies the northern edge of the neighborhood and is now owned by Amtrak and shared with NJ Transit Rail Operations. The yard's deck has been the subject of repeated proposals for housing development above the active rails. Calvary Cemetery is located south of the Brooklyn–Queens Expressway and abuts the southern and eastern edge of the neighborhood.

The principal commercial corridors are Queens Boulevard, Greenpoint Avenue between 39th and 49th Streets, and Skillman Avenue and 43rd Avenue.

== History ==
=== Pre-1909 ===
The area was farmed in colonial times by the Bragaw family, French Huguenot settlers who acquired land at Dutch Kills in 1690. During the Revolution, British forces occupied the Sunnyside area from 1776 to 1783, billeting troops in the colonial farmhouses along old Middleburgh Avenue (now 39th Avenue) to control the strategic "Narrow Passage" at the junction of present-day Northern Boulevard, Woodside Avenue, and Newtown Avenue. According to the local historian Vincent F. Seyfried, Richard Bragaw built a gambrel-roofed house "in the English style atop Sunnyside Hill" in 1790, on the line of present-day 32nd Place between Northern Boulevard and Skillman Avenue; the house was demolished in July 1903 after the Pennsylvania Railroad acquired the property as part of the land assembly for the Sunnyside Yard. A 1925 county history and a 2016 railroad history of Sunnyside Yard trace the area's name to "Sunnyside Hill," the Bragaw family estate established with that 1690 purchase and consolidated under Brocard's son Isaac in 1713. The Encyclopedia of New York City alternatively traces the modern neighborhood's name to a roadhouse built on Jackson Avenue in the 1850s and 1860s for visitors to the Fashion Race Course in Corona. South of Jackson Avenue, the Fitting, Gosman, Heiser, Lowery, and Van Buren families owned farms that were subdivided in the 1880s and 1890s, and a small hamlet built between Northern and Queens Boulevards came to be known as Sunnyside. The area was incorporated into Long Island City when that city was chartered on May 4, 1870, and into the City of Greater New York when Long Island City was consolidated into Greater New York on January 1, 1898.

In 1901, the Irish-American Athletic Club established Celtic Park near 48th Avenue and 43rd Street as a venue for Gaelic games and other Irish-American sporting events.

The Pennsylvania Railroad adopted a plan in 1901 for a large rail yard in the area, and between 1902 and 1905 it acquired the land south of Northern Boulevard between 21st and 43rd Streets, much of which was low-lying marshland. The Pennsylvania Railroad acquisitions and demolitions continued through 1905. Between 1907 and 1908, it leveled an approximately 200-acre hill at 34th and 35th Streets and used the earth to fill some 250 acres of tidal marsh at the headwaters of Dutch Kills. At its opening the largest coach yard in the world, Sunnyside Yard opened to rail traffic in November 1910, occupying 192 acres (78 ha) and containing 25.7 miles of track.

=== 1909–1929 ===
The opening of the Queensboro Bridge in 1909 and the extension of the Flushing Line subway across Queens Boulevard in 1917 made Sunnyside accessible to Manhattan and triggered apartment construction. Through the 1920s, much of the area was built up, and the neighborhood became a bedroom community for middle-class workers commuting to Manhattan.

Industrial development accompanied the residential boom on land adjoining the new Sunnyside Yards: by 1912 the Degnon Terminal, a rail-served industrial complex developed by Michael J. Degnon's Degnon Terminal & Realty Company, was largely built out, with early tenants including the Loose-Wiles Biscuit Company (later Sunshine Biscuits), the Packard Motor Car Company, the American Ever Ready Co., and the American Chicle Company. In 1922 the Metropolitan Life Insurance Company broke ground on the Metropolitan Houses, an early Sunnyside multi-family apartment complex on the blocks bounded by Queens Boulevard, 48th Avenue, 48th Street, and 49th Street; the complex was later renamed Cosmopolitan Houses after Met Life sold the property, and portions remain federally subsidized.

Between 1924 and 1928, the City Housing Corporation, a limited-dividend organization led by developer Alexander Bing, built Sunnyside Gardens on a 77-acre site of about 16 blocks north of Queens Boulevard, between 43rd and 51st Streets. Architects Clarence Stein, Henry Wright, and Frederick L. Ackerman, working with landscape architect Marjorie Sewell Cautley, designed the development as a garden city–inspired community of low-rise attached brick houses arranged around shared interior courts. The development comprised 1,202 housing units and was the first major American application of the principles of Ebenezer Howard and Raymond Unwin. It was promoted by the Regional Planning Association of America, whose members included Lewis Mumford.

Reflecting the neighborhood's growth over this decade, ridership at the Lowery St. subway station increased from 256,080 in 1923 to 2,117,809 in 1930.

=== 1930–1960 ===
In 1931, the philanthropic Phipps Houses organization, founded by the family of steel industrialist Henry Phipps Jr., opened the Phipps Garden Apartments at 39th Avenue and 50th Street, on land adjoining Sunnyside Gardens. Designed by Clarence Stein, the original 1931 complex consisted of 22 connected four- and six-story buildings housing 344 families, arranged around a landscaped interior courtyard. A second group of thirteen four-story buildings was added on the northern portion of the superblock in 1935.

On August 6, 1931, the jazz cornetist Bix Beiderbecke died in his apartment at 43-30 46th Street.

The Depression brought heavy losses to the new homeowners of Sunnyside Gardens; about half lost their homes to foreclosure during the 1930s, and marshals attempting evictions were sometimes met with organized resistance. Sunnyside Gardens residents organized rent and mortgage strikes in response to the wave of foreclosures. The remainder of Sunnyside's prewar apartment stock was completed during the 1930s and 1940s, much of it as middle-income rental housing. In the 1940s and 1950s, the apartments of Sunnyside attracted artists and writers from lower Manhattan in such numbers that the neighborhood became known as the "maternity ward of Greenwich Village".

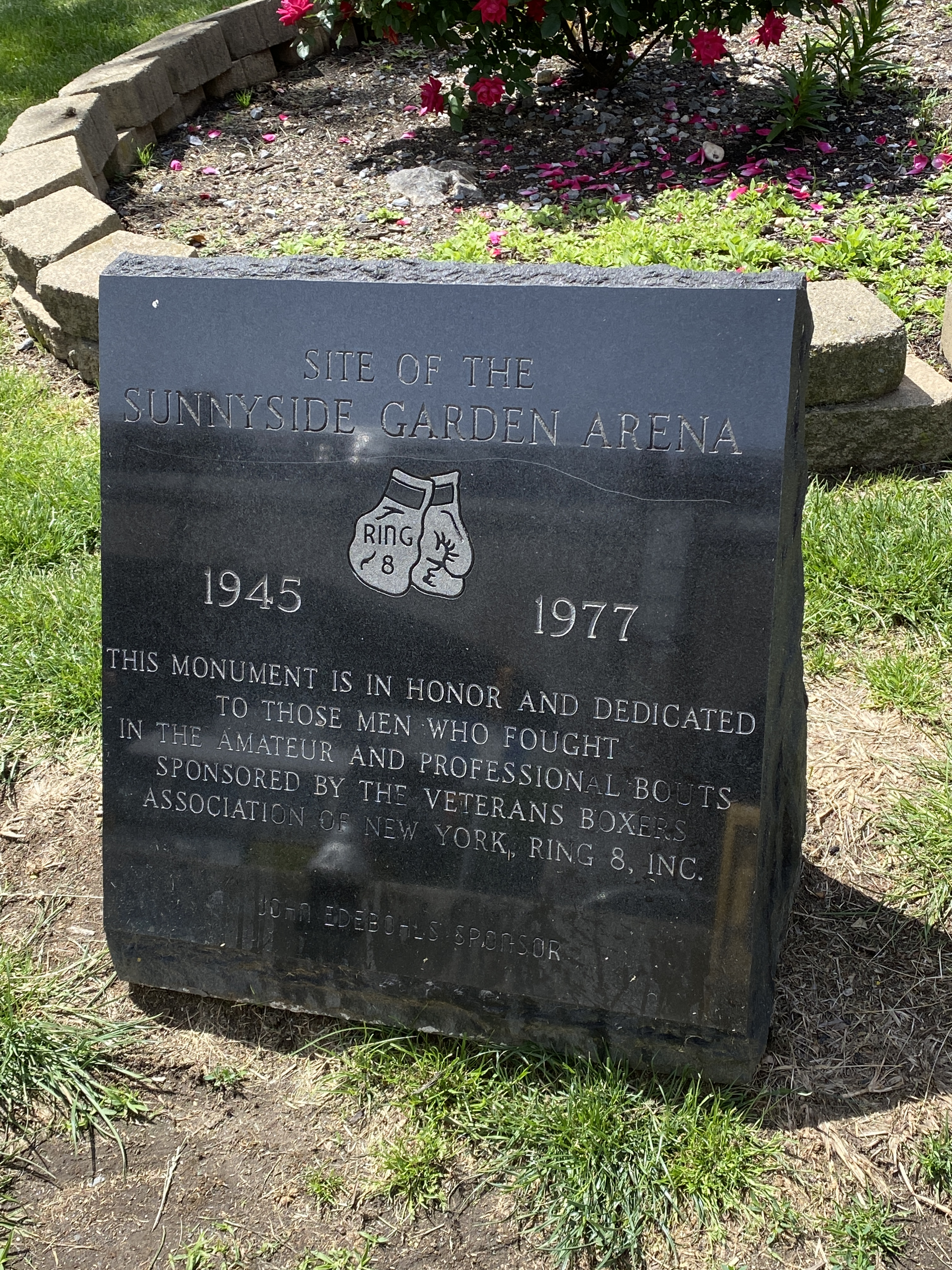
Sunnyside Garden Arena Plaque

Sunnyside Garden Arena, at 44-11 Queens Boulevard, operated as a boxing and wrestling venue from the mid-1940s until June 24, 1977. The arena seated about 2,500 spectators and hosted bouts featuring Floyd Patterson, Emile Griffith, José Torres, and Gerry Cooney, as well as Golden Gloves tournaments; under owner Michael Rosenberg in the 1970s the venue's programming also extended to karate, dancing, and bingo. John F. Kennedy delivered a campaign address at the venue on October 27, 1960, less than two weeks before the presidential election, and the DuMont Television Network broadcast a weekly program, Boxing From Sunnyside Gardens, from the venue from 1949 to 1950. The arena was demolished in late 1977; a memorial monument was installed at the former site (now a Wendy's restaurant) in October 2012, and a portion of 45th Street was co-named in its honor in 2014.

=== 1960s–1990s ===
Beginning in the 1960s and accelerating after the Immigration and Nationality Act of 1965, successive waves of immigrants settled in Sunnyside. In July 1977, The New York Times reported that Armenian refugees fleeing the civil war in Lebanon were resettling in the neighborhood, describing how "the exotic sounds of spoken Armenian have been spreading in the homey sidestreets of Sunnyside, Queens." In the late 1960s, threats from urban blight and white flight prompted the formation of local civic groups such as Gateway Community Services, which worked to combat crime and improve schools in Sunnyside and adjacent Woodside. Despite these changes, the article observed that Sunnyside "continues to house two and three generations of its original home buyers." A 1971 New York Times article characterized Sunnyside as a somewhat marginalized community of 50,000 people that was suffering from a narcotics problem, though it had relatively little violent crime. The article described Sunnyside as a "generally blue collar community, until recently virtually all‐white, mostly Irish‐American, with a sprinkling of Jews. Now there are Colombians and Puerto Ricans and a smattering of blacks."

According to Ultimate Classic Rock and contemporaneous reporting, the rock band Kiss played its first concert on January 30, 1973, at the Coventry (formerly the Popcorn Pub), a small live-music venue at 47-03 Queens Boulevard near 47th Street; the Ramones also played early shows at the venue.

In 1974 the New York City Department of City Planning designated Sunnyside Gardens a Special Planned Community Preservation District (together with Fresh Meadows, Parkchester, and the Harlem River Houses) to protect the original design. The Sunnyside Gardens Conservancy was formed in 1981 to restore the neighborhood, and through its advocacy the district was listed on the National Register of Historic Places on September 7, 1984. A further preservation campaign by neighborhood residents culminated in the New York City Landmarks Preservation Commission's designation of Sunnyside Gardens (including Phipps Garden Apartments) as a New York City historic district on June 26, 2007.

A 1994 New York Times real-estate feature reported that over the previous fifteen years the neighborhood's population had grown from about 22,000 to nearly 30,000, attributing the increase to young professional families seeking proximity to Manhattan in a suburban setting; the article also characterized Sunnyside's population as "once largely Irish and Italian" but by then expanded to include recent immigrants from Eastern Europe, Southeast Asia, Turkey, and the Middle East. Through the 1990s, Sunnyside also saw a resurgence of its Irish community alongside the existing Korean, Spanish, Romanian, German, and Greek populations, with several Irish pubs opening on or near Queens Boulevard as gathering places for a younger generation of Irish residents. Korean, Turkish, and Romanian immigrants arrived in the 1980s, and Mexican immigrants in growing numbers in the 1990s and 2000s.

=== 2000s–present ===
The Sunnyside Shines business improvement district was authorized by the New York City Council and signed into law by Mayor Michael Bloomberg on September 5, 2007, covering 92 properties along Queens Boulevard, Greenpoint Avenue, and South Roosevelt Avenue.

In 2018, after several years of debate touched off by the death of cyclist Gelacio Reyes the previous year, the New York City Department of Transportation installed parking-protected bicycle lanes on Skillman and 43rd Avenues. The project was opposed by some local merchants and by Queens Community Board 2, which voted against it, but was directed to proceed by Mayor Bill de Blasio and Council Member Jimmy Van Bramer.

In 2017 the New York City Economic Development Corporation and Amtrak began a feasibility study for residential development above Sunnyside Yard. A master plan released in March 2020 proposed a 12,000-unit deck of affordable housing above the active rail yard along with 60 acres of new public open space; the plan was not advanced to construction during the de Blasio administration. Mayor Zohran Mamdani revived the proposal in March 2026.

A 2015 New York Times real-estate feature described Sunnyside as "an old-fashioned New York neighborhood of squat prewar apartment buildings, rowhouses and shopping streets that still have mom-and-pop businesses," and quoted local real-estate broker Amy FitzGerald as saying "we call it Mayberry," after the small town in The Andy Griffith Show.

In December 2020, Queens Community Board 2 voted 28 to 12 to support a Phipps Houses application to rezone a parking lot at 50-25 Barnett Avenue, on the campus of the existing Phipps Garden Apartments, to permit a seven-story, 167-unit affordable housing building. Twenty-five units were reserved for formerly homeless families at 40 percent of the area median income, with the balance offered at 90 percent of AMI. The proposal drew opposition from some Phipps Garden Apartments tenants and from State Senator Michael Gianaris and Assembly Member Brian Barnwell, who cited concerns about Phipps Houses's management of its existing properties and the affordability of the proposed rents. The completed building's housing lottery launched in April 2026.

== Architecture and housing ==
Sunnyside's residential building stock dates almost entirely from the interwar period (roughly 1917–1941). North of Queens Boulevard, the Sunnyside Gardens development applied the principles of the British garden-city movement.

=== Sunnyside Gardens ===
Sunnyside Gardens, built between 1924 and 1928 by the City Housing Corporation, applied the principles of the British garden-city movement at city scale. The development covers 77 acres across about 16 blocks between 43rd and 51st Streets, north of Queens Boulevard. Architects Clarence Stein and Henry Wright, working with Frederick L. Ackerman and the landscape architect Marjorie Sewell Cautley, designed the development "according to ideals of 'health, open space, greenery, and idyllic community living for all'". The buildings consist of one-, two-, and three-family attached brick houses with slate roofs, gables, and porches, arranged around open center courts with tree-lined pathways and private and communal flower gardens. Cautley, who designed the gardens, was one of the first female landscape architects in the United States. The site comprised 1,202 housing units in a mix of cooperative, rental, and limited-dividend tenures. Within the development, Sunnyside Gardens Park, a privately owned roughly three-acre common space opened in 1926 and maintained by member-residents, is one of only two private residential parks in New York City, alongside Manhattan's Gramercy Park.

During the Depression of the 1930s, about half the homeowners of Sunnyside Gardens lost their homes to foreclosure; eviction attempts by city marshals were sometimes met with organized resistance. The 40-year covenants that had governed the development's open spaces expired in 1966, after which some residents fenced their rear yards, plastered over brick facades, or built driveways, breaking up several of the original courts.

In 1974 the New York City Department of City Planning designated Sunnyside Gardens a Special Planned Community Preservation District in order to protect the original design. The Sunnyside Gardens Conservancy was formed in 1981, and through its advocacy the district was listed on the National Register of Historic Places on September 7, 1984. The New York City Landmarks Preservation Commission designated Sunnyside Gardens (including Phipps Garden Apartments) a New York City historic district on June 26, 2007.

=== Phipps Garden Apartments ===
Adjacent to Sunnyside Gardens, on 39th Avenue between 50th and 52nd Streets, the Phipps Garden Apartments complex was built in two phases by Phipps Houses, the philanthropic real-estate organization established by the family of Henry Phipps Jr. The first phase, designed by Clarence Stein, opened on September 1, 1931, and consisted of 22 connected four- and six-story buildings housing 344 families arranged around a landscaped interior courtyard. A second northern group of thirteen four-story buildings was completed in 1935. Half of the buildings are six-story elevator houses; half are four-story walk-ups. Original rents in 1931 ranged from $31 to $80 per month. Phipps Garden Apartments is a contributing property within the Sunnyside Gardens Historic District.

=== Adaptive reuse and other notable buildings ===
The former Knickerbocker Laundry Factory at 43-23 37th Avenue, an Art Deco structure built in 1932, was converted to use as the New York Presbyterian Church in the late 1990s. The conversion was reviewed by Herbert Muschamp in The New York Times. The Celtic Park Apartments, on the site of the former Irish-American Athletic Club athletic field, were built starting in 1931. The nine-acre, 756-unit complex spans 42nd to 44th Streets between 48th and 50th Avenues, straddling the boundary between Sunnyside and adjacent Woodside, and was converted to cooperative ownership in May 1986.

=== Sunnyside Arch ===
In 1983, a steel gantry over 46th Street at its intersection with Queens Boulevard, spelling out "Sunnyside" in metal letters and backlit by neon and later LED lighting, was erected as a gateway marker for the neighborhood's principal commercial corridor. In 2001, local council member Walter L. McCaffrey and Queens Community Board 2 persuaded Queens Borough President Claire Shulman to contribute $75,000 of her discretionary funds to repair the arch and restore its light bulbs; McCaffrey said the arch, at the time in disrepair, was "an overly grand gesture in that it was not matched with reality." The arch's lighting has been intermittent in subsequent years and was the subject of a $15,000 LED retrofit announced in 2017.

== Demographics ==
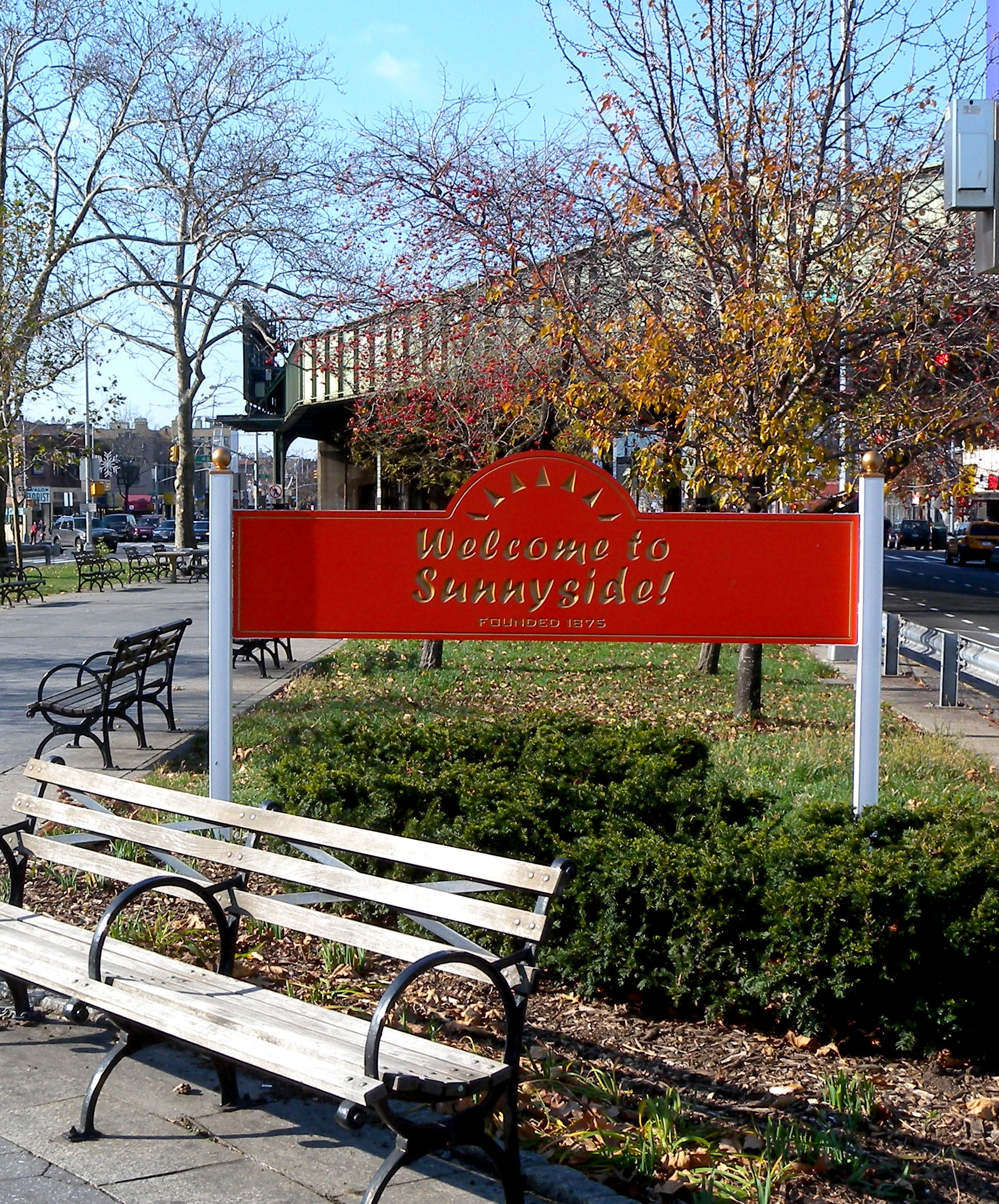
Welcome to Sunnyside sign

Based on data from the 2020 United States census, the population of the Sunnyside Neighborhood Tabulation Area (NTA) was 52,278, corresponding to a population density of 47.8 people per acre, slightly denser than New York City's 45.8 people per acre. Depending on the boundaries used, population estimates vary. Citing 2019-2023 American Community Survey (ACS) 5-year estimates within its "Sunnyside Context Area", a New York City Department of Small Business Services study reported the neighborhood's population as 49,034. Meanwhile, the New York Comptroller's Office, also citing the 2019-2023 ACS population estimate, reported Sunnyside's population as 47,507.

The racial makeup of the neighborhood was 31.4% (16,395) non-Hispanic White, 3.3% (1,716) African American, 25.1% (13,123) Asian, 1.2% (621) other races, 2.8% (1,466) two or more races, and 36.3% (18,957) Hispanic or Latino of any race. About 49.6% of residents were born in a US state (37.7% in New York), 3% were born in Puerto Rico, U.S. Island areas, or born abroad to American parent(s), and 47.4% were foreign-born (more than New York City's overall foreign-born share of 36.5% and just below the 47.6% foreign-born share for Queens).

As of the 2019-2023 American Community Survey, the median household income in Sunnyside was $80,933, compared to $84,961 in all of Queens and $79,713 in New York City as a whole. An estimated 7.9% of residents lived in poverty, compared to 9.4% in Queens and 13.6% in New York City. The unemployment rate was 6.4%, compared to 7% in Queens and 7.7% in New York City. About 78.3%% of residents lived in rental housing, whereas 21.7% resided in owner-occupied housing. Among renters, 50% paid more than 30% of their income on rent (vs 52.4% in Queens) and 21.5% paid 50% or more of their income on rent (vs 27.6% in Queens).

The neighborhood has a median age of 38.8 years, versus 40.4 for Queens and 38.0 years for New York City. About 17% of residents are under-18 years old (versus 19.8% for Queens and 20.4% for New York City), and 13.5% are aged 65 years and older (versus 17.2% for Queens and 16.0% for New York City). Twenty-percent of households include children under 18 years old (versus 24.0% in Queens and 23.1% citywide), and 39% of households consisted of a householder alone (versus 26.5% in Queens and 33.4% citywide). The average household size was 2.23 (versus 2.77 in Queens and 2.51 citywide).

Sunnyside has a long history of immigration. The neighborhood developed in the 1910s and 1920s as a working- and middle-class destination for Irish, German, Italian, and Eastern European arrivals to New York. According to The Encyclopedia of New York City, Korean, Turkish, and Romanian immigrants arrived in the 1980s, and Mexican immigrants in growing numbers in the 1990s and 2000s. Subsequent immigration drew significant numbers of arrivals from Ecuador, Colombia, Bangladesh, and Nepal; according to the New York City Department of City Planning's 2013 Newest New Yorkers report, the Hunters Point–Sunnyside–West Maspeth neighborhood had the city's greatest concentration of Nepalese-born residents. By 2019, the Asian American Federation identified Sunnyside as one of four Queens neighborhoods where the city's Nepalese community was largely concentrated, alongside Elmhurst, Jackson Heights, and Woodside, and local coverage described Sunnyside as part of an emerging "Little Nepal" in western Queens. Members of the Tibetan and broader Himalayan community in New York, which is centered in adjacent Jackson Heights and Woodside, also live in Sunnyside.

The entirety of Community District 2, which comprises Long Island City, Sunnyside and Woodside, had 135,972 inhabitants as of NYC Health's 2018 Community Health Profile, with an average life expectancy of 85.4 years. This is higher than the median life expectancy of 81.2 for all New York City neighborhoods.

== Commerce ==
The principal commercial corridors of Sunnyside are Queens Boulevard between approximately 38th and 50th Streets, Greenpoint Avenue between 39th and 49th Streets, Skillman Avenue, and 43rd Avenue corridors. The Roosevelt Avenue section between 48th and 50th Streets, on the boundary with Woodside, also falls within Sunnyside's commercial geography.

The Sunnyside Shines business improvement district (BID) was authorized by the New York City Council and signed into law by Mayor Michael Bloomberg on September 5, 2007. At its formation, the BID covered 92 properties along Queens Boulevard, Greenpoint Avenue, and South Roosevelt Avenue, and was the thirteenth such district authorized under the Bloomberg administration. It funds streetscape maintenance, holiday lighting, marketing, and public-realm improvements within its district.

Sunnyside has a range of restaurants reflecting the neighborhood's ethnic diversity, with Irish pubs and Turkish restaurants along Queens Boulevard, a Latin American commercial strip along Greenpoint Avenue, and an international mix of restaurants, markets, bars, and cafes along Skillman Avenue. Local press and food media have also documented Indian and Pakistani, Lebanese, Peruvian, Bolivian, Romanian, and Tibetan and Nepalese establishments tied to the area's Himalayan immigrant community. The Thalia Spanish Theatre, on Greenpoint Avenue, is bilingual, presenting performances in English and Spanish along with music and dance programming.

== Police and crime ==
Woodside, Sunnyside, and Long Island City are patrolled by the 108th Precinct of the NYPD, located at 5-47 50th Avenue. The 108th Precinct ranked 25th safest out of 69 patrol areas for per-capita crime in 2010. As of 2018, with a non-fatal assault rate of 19 per 100,000 people, Sunnyside and Woodside's rate of violent crimes per capita is less than that of the city as a whole. The incarceration rate of 163 per 100,000 people is lower than that of the city as a whole.

The 108th Precinct has a lower crime rate than in the 1990s, with crimes across all categories having decreased by 88.2% between 1990 and 2018. The precinct reported 2 murders, 12 rapes, 90 robberies, 108 felony assaults, 109 burglaries, 490 grand larcenies, and 114 grand larcenies auto in 2018.

== Fire safety ==
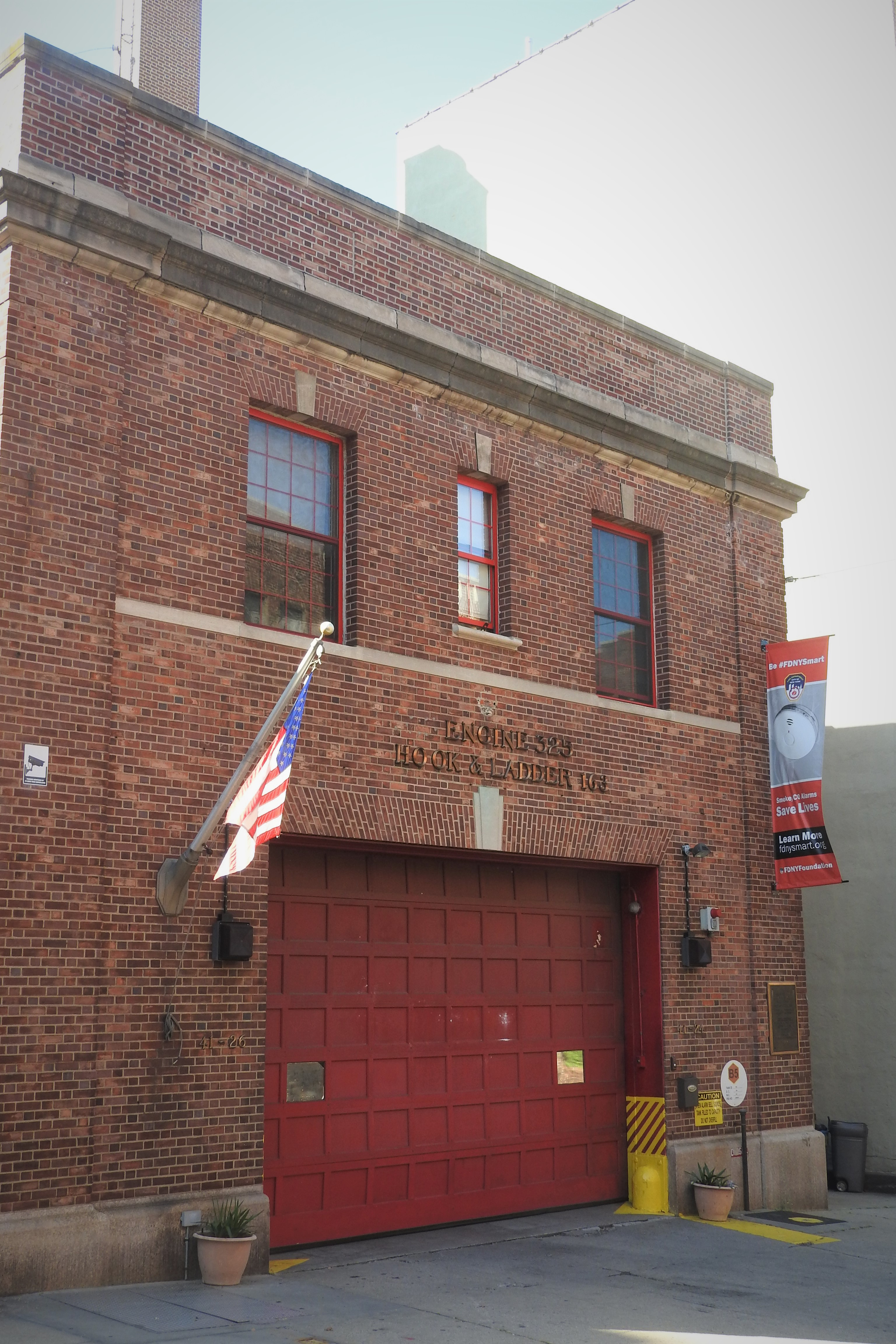
Firehouse for Engine 325/H&L 163

Sunnyside is served by the following New York City Fire Department (FDNY) fire stations:

- Engine Co. 325/Ladder Co. 163, 41-24 51st Street
- Engine Co. 259/Ladder Co. 128/Battalion 45, 33-51 Greenpoint Avenue

== Health ==
As of 2018, preterm births are more common in Sunnyside and Woodside than in other places citywide, but births to teenage mothers are less common. In Sunnyside and Woodside, there were 90 preterm births per 1,000 live births (compared to 87 per 1,000 citywide), and 14.9 births to teenage mothers per 1,000 live births (compared to 19.3 per 1,000 citywide). Sunnyside and Woodside has a high population of residents who are uninsured. In 2018, this population of uninsured residents was estimated to be 16%, which is higher than the citywide rate of 12%.

The concentration of fine particulate matter, the deadliest type of air pollutant, in Sunnyside and Woodside is 0.0093 milligrams per cubic metre (9.3×10^{−9} oz/ft^{3}), higher than the city average. Fourteen percent of Sunnyside and Woodside residents are smokers, which is equal to the city average of 14% of residents being smokers. In Sunnyside and Woodside, 20% of residents are obese, 9% are diabetic, and 23% have high blood pressure—compared to the citywide averages of 20%, 14%, and 24% respectively. In addition, 19% of children are obese, compared to the citywide average of 20%.

Ninety-two percent of residents eat some fruits and vegetables every day, which is higher than the city's average of 87%. In 2018, 79% of residents described their health as "good", "very good", or "excellent", slightly higher than the city's average of 78%. For every supermarket in Sunnyside and Woodside, there are 17 bodegas.

The nearest large hospitals in the area are the Elmhurst Hospital Center in Elmhurst and the Mount Sinai Hospital of Queens in Astoria.

== Post office and ZIP codes ==
Sunnyside is covered by three ZIP codes. The area west of 39th Street is covered by 11101, while Sunnyside Gardens is located in 11104, and the area east of 45th Street is inside 11377. The United States Post Office operates the Sunnyside Station at 45-15 44th Street.

== Education ==
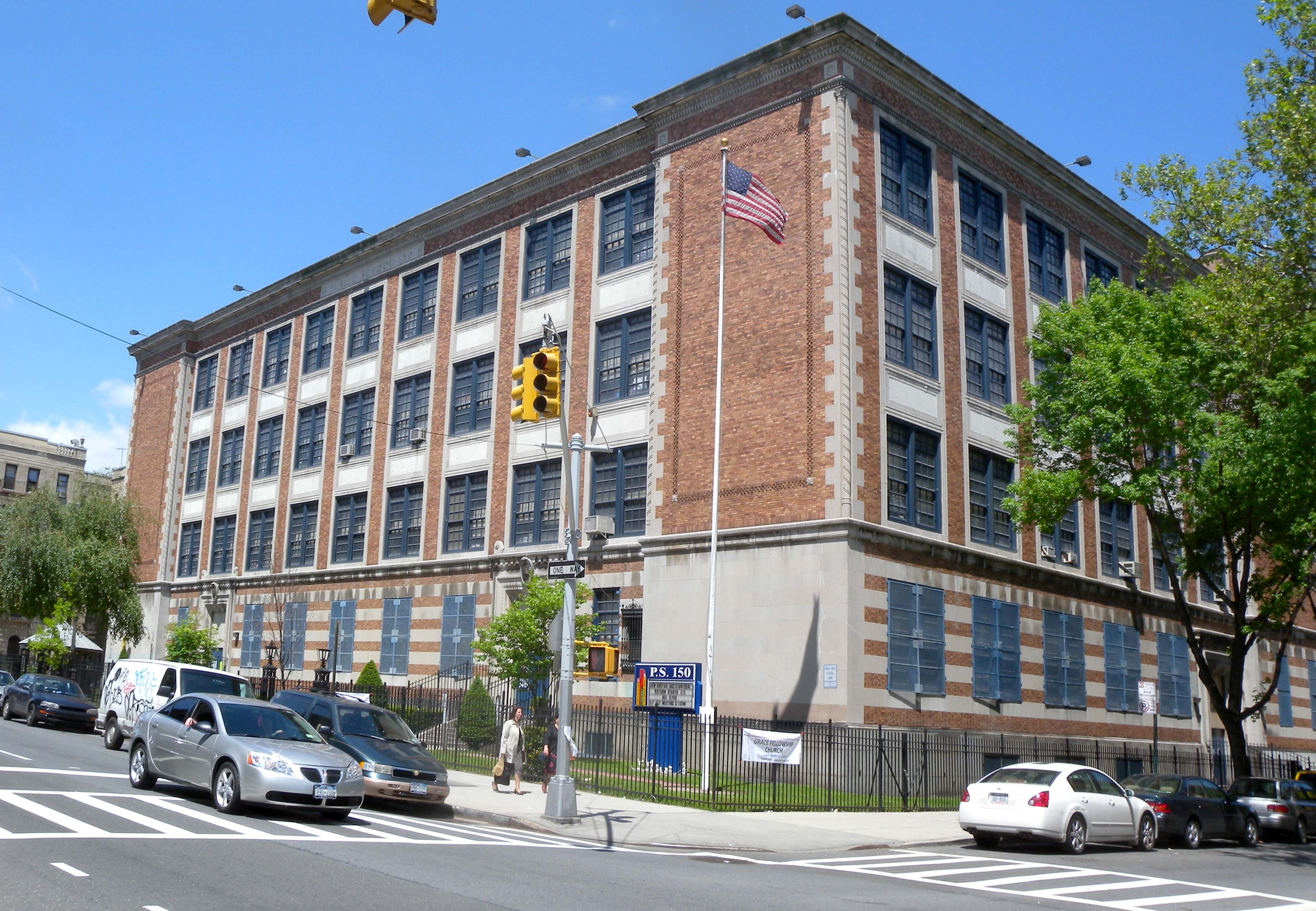
PS 150

Sunnyside and Woodside generally has a slightly higher ratio of college-educated residents than the rest of the city as of 2018. While 45% of residents age 25 and older have a college education or higher, 19% have less than a high school education and 35% are high school graduates or have some college education. By contrast, 39% of Queens residents and 43% of city residents have a college education or higher. The percentage of Sunnyside and Woodside students excelling in math rose from 40% in 2000 to 65% in 2011, and reading achievement rose from 45% to 49% during the same time period.

Sunnyside and Woodside's rate of elementary school student absenteeism is less than the rest of New York City. In Sunnyside and Woodside, 11% of elementary school students missed twenty or more days per school year, lower than the citywide average of 20%. Additionally, 86% of high school students in Sunnyside and Woodside graduate on time, more than the citywide average of 75%.

=== Schools ===
Sunnyside contains public schools in two New York City Department of Education community school districts: District 30 north of Queens Boulevard and District 24 south of Queens Boulevard.

- PS 150 Sunnyside (grades PK-5)
- PS 199 Maurice A Fitzgerald (grades PK-5)
- IS 429 (grades 6–8)
- IS 125 Thomas J McCann Woodside (grades 6–8)
- Robert F Wagner Junior Secondary School-Arts and Technology (grades 6–12)
- PS 343 The Children's Lab School (grades K-5), which opened in September 2014
- Academy of Finance and Enterprise (grades 9–12)
- Aviation Career & Technical Education High School (grades 9–12)
- Queens Vocational and Technical High School (grades 9–12)

=== Library ===
The Queens Public Library's Sunnyside branch is located at 43-06 Greenpoint Avenue.

== Community organizations ==
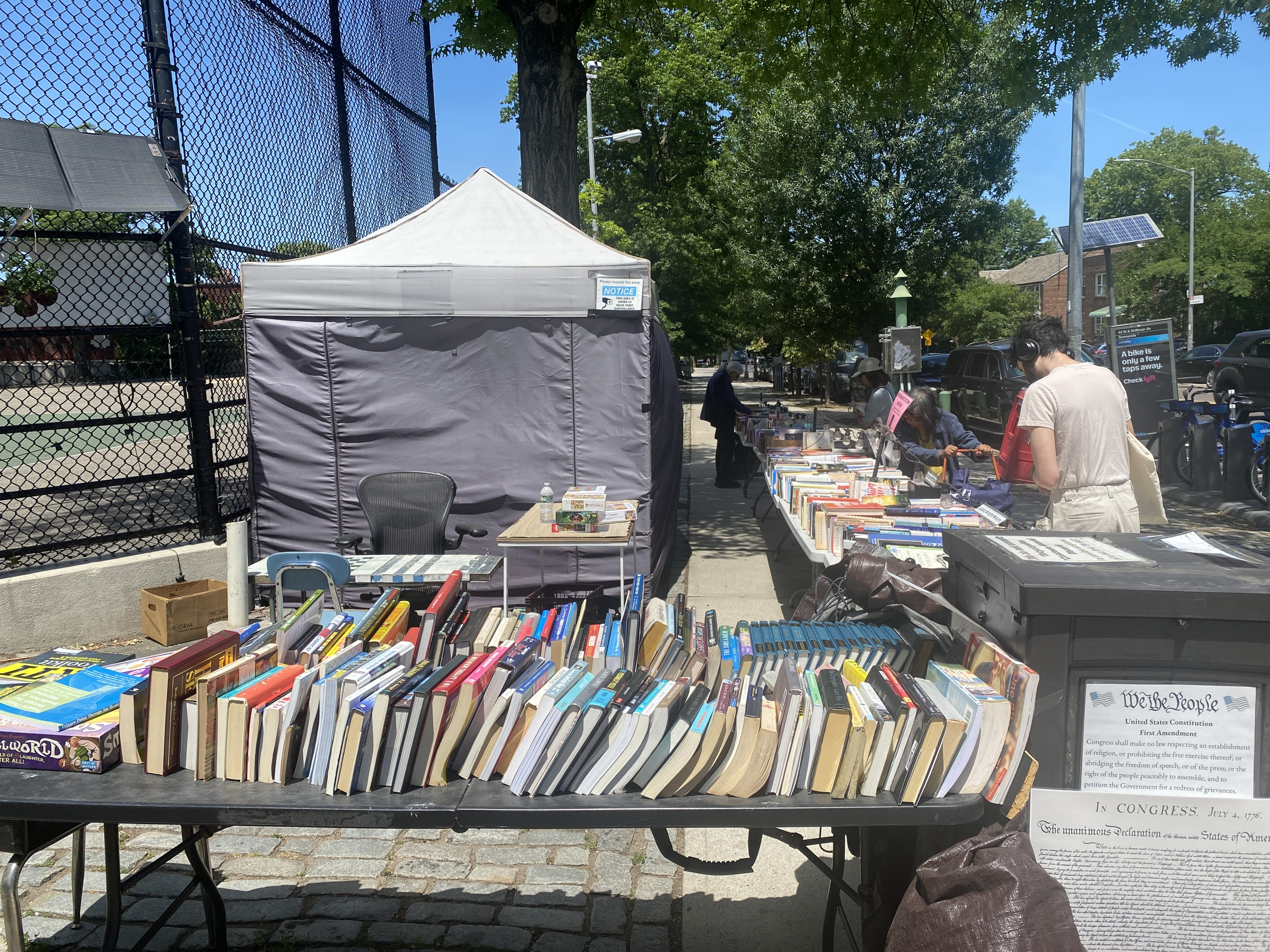
- Sunnyside Book and Media Swap
  Sunnyside Book and Media Swap - Skillman Ave. and 43rd St. Northwest Corner
- Sunnyside Community Services - 43-31 39th St.
- Sunnyside Shines Business Improvement District - 45-56 43rd St.
- Sunnyside Chamber of Commerce
- Sunnyside & Woodside Mutual Aid
- Woodside-Sunnyside Runners

=== Houses of worship ===
There are numerous churches and temples in Sunnyside that support its diverse religious communities.

- All Saints Church, located at 43-12 46th St. The Episcopal Mission in Sunnyside hosts year-long artist residencies. Artists-in-residence included a nonbinary singer in 2024 and a risograph art press in 2025.
- New York Presbyterian Church, located at 43-23 37th Avenue, is historically notable; the original structure was built in 1932 as the Knickerbocker Laundry Factory.
- Mosaic West Church and Community Center is located at 46-01 43rd Avenue. During the COVID-19 pandemic in New York City, local business owner Sofia Moncayo led a volunteer-run food pantry at the church.
- Islamic Institute of New York, located at 55-11 Queens Boulevard.
- Sunnyside Muslim Center, located at 39-18 47th Ave.
- Queen of Angels Church, located at 44-04 Skillman Ave.
- Sunnyside Reformed Church, 48-03 Skillman Avenue, organized in July 1896.
- Mimar Sinan Mosque, Sunnyside, located at 45-06 Skillman Ave.

=== Community Gardens ===
- 45th Street Composters and Community Garden, a.k.a Resistance is Fertile, 41-12 45th St.
- Sunnyside Community Garden, 38-01 50th St.

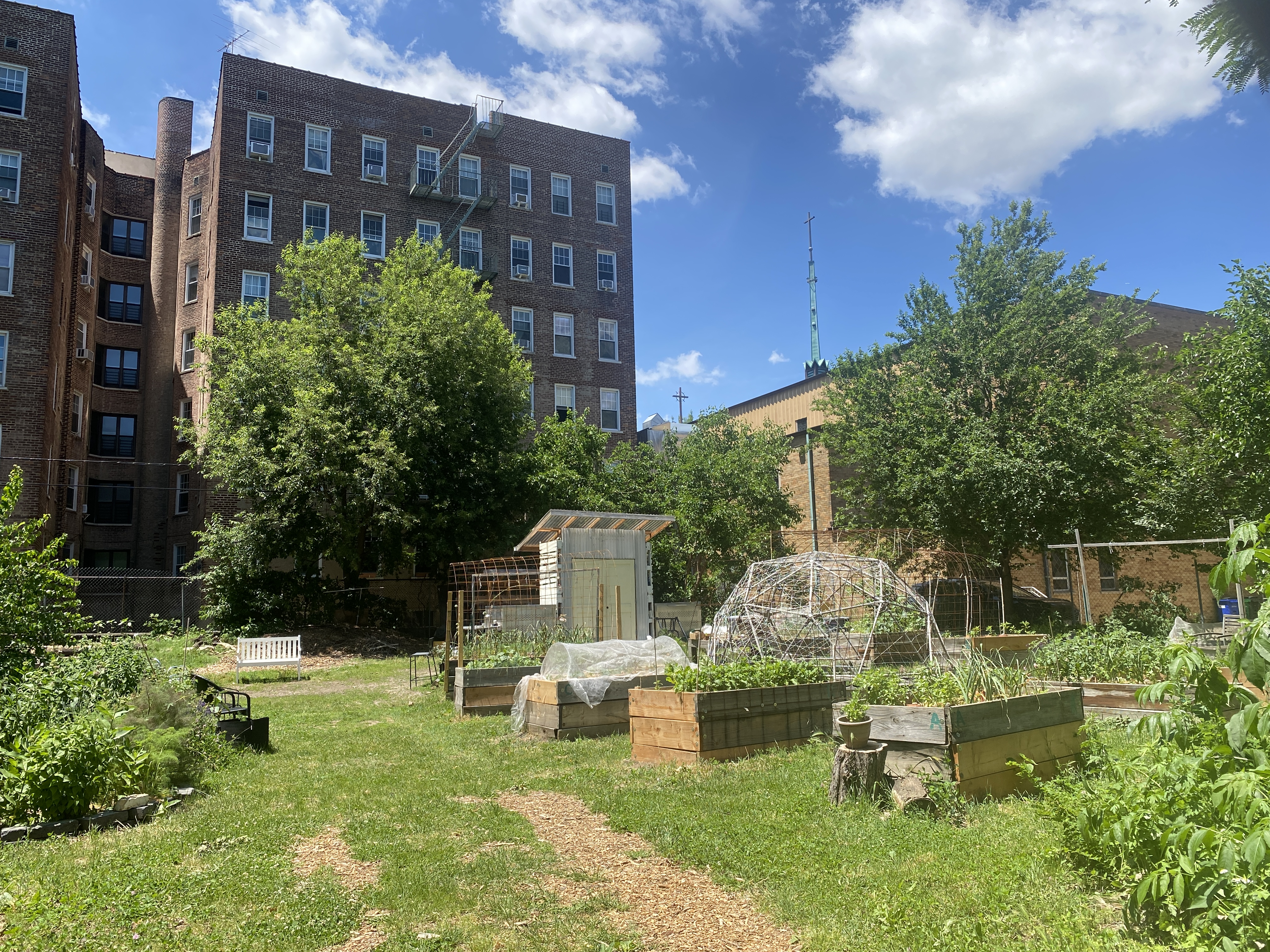
45th St. Composters and Community Garden

== Parks and recreation ==
Sunnyside contains several public parks operated by the New York City Department of Parks and Recreation:

- L/CPL Thomas P. Noonan Jr. Playground, bounded by Greenpoint Avenue, 43rd Street, 42nd Street, and 47th Avenue. The site was acquired by the city in 1936 as Thomson Hill Park. In 1996, the park was renamed in honor of Thomas P. Noonan Jr., a United States Marine Corps lance corporal and Sunnyside resident who was killed in Vietnam in 1969 and posthumously awarded the Medal of Honor.
- Torsney Playground / Lou Lodati Playground, at Skillman Avenue and 43rd Street. Built in the 1950s and named for George F. Torsney, a local political figure and World War I veteran, the park contains the Lou Lodati Playground, named in 1999 by New York City Council resolution for the longtime community organizer Lou Lodati (1908–1996), known locally as "the Mayor of Sunnyside". The playground reopened on June 22, 2013, after a $1.4 million renovation jointly funded by Queens Borough President Helen Marshall and Council Member Jimmy Van Bramer. A further $7.15 million in capital funding for additional improvements was allocated by Council Member Julie Won in fiscal year 2024.
- Joe Sabba Park, in the median of Queens Boulevard between 48th and 49th Streets. The park is named for Joe Sabba, a World War II veteran from the neighborhood.
- Lt. Michael R. Davidson Playground, located on 39th Avenue between 50th Street and 51st Street on the site of the former private playground of the adjacent Phipps Garden Apartments, is a 0.23 acre park that broke ground in April 2025. Named after a firefighter who grew up in Phipps Garden Apartments and died in the line of duty in 2018, the park features a firefighter-themed children's play area, seating area, public restroom, and a restored historic pavilion. In 2019, the city purchased the land after a 2013 proposal to build an 8-story apartment building alongside a relocated Aluminaire House was rejected. A ribbon cutting ceremony officially opening the playground occurred on June 18, 2026.

In addition to public parks, the neighborhood has Sunnyside Gardens Park, a privately owned two-and-a-half acre park opened in 1926 and maintained by member-residents. The park has a two-story community facility, one-story storage building, children's playground, basketball court, and three tennis courts. The park also has a baseball field and grass picnic area. Sunnyside Gardens Park is one of only two private residential parks in New York City, alongside Manhattan's Gramercy Park.

=== St. Pats for All Parade ===
Portions of the neighborhood are along the route of the annual St. Pat's for All parade, an inclusive Saint Patrick's Day celebration founded in 2000 by Brendan Fay and Ellen Duncan in response to the exclusion of LGBT Irish groups from the Manhattan St. Patrick's Day Parade by the Ancient Order of Hibernians. The inaugural parade on March 5, 2000, drew First Lady Hillary Clinton and Father Mychal Judge among its marchers, and proceeds along Skillman Avenue between 43rd Street in Sunnyside and 58th Street in adjacent Woodside. Its slogan, "Cherishing All the Children of the Nation Equally," derives from the Proclamation of the Irish Republic of the 1916 Easter Rising.

== Transportation ==
=== Subway and bus ===
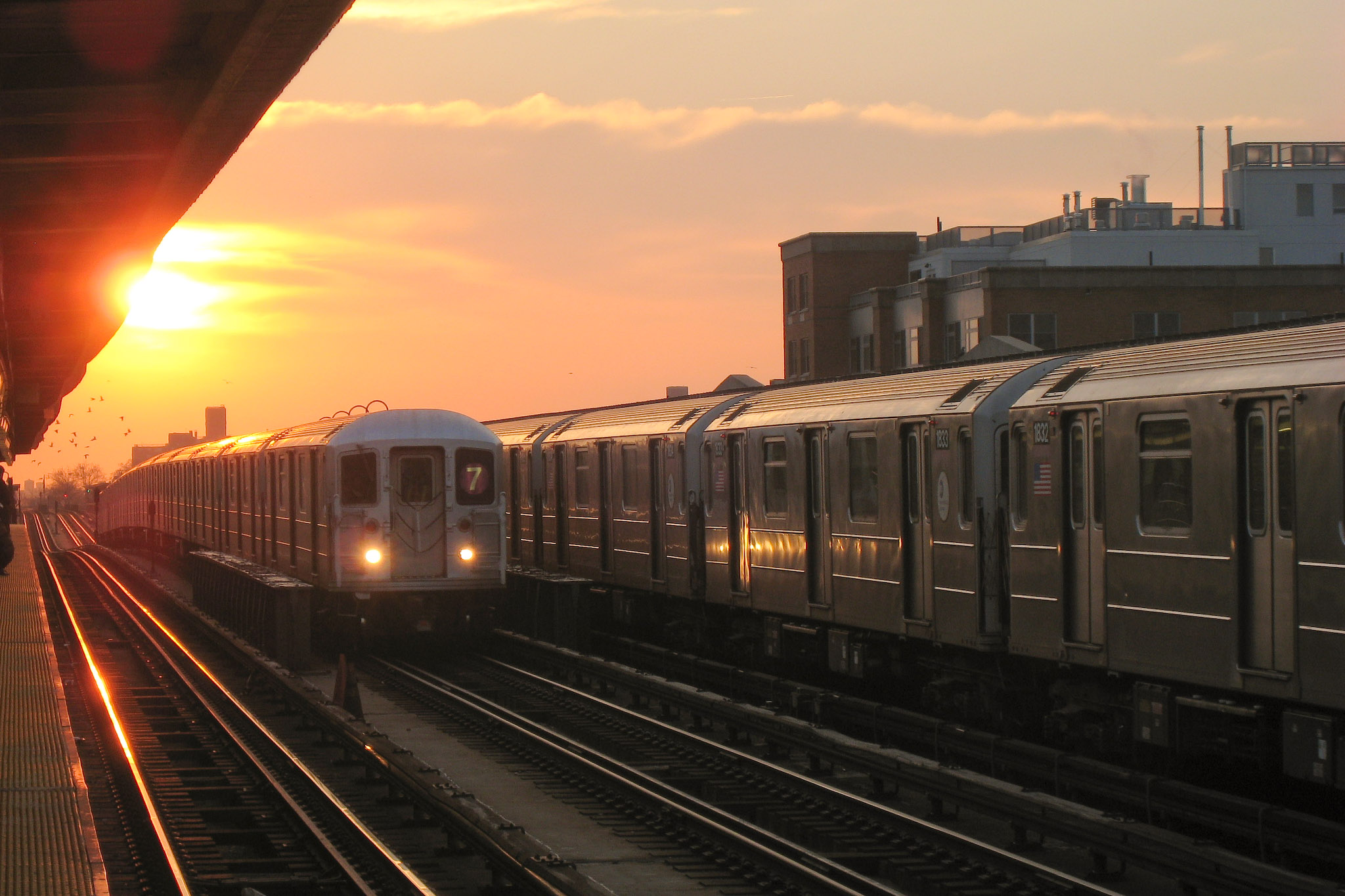
7 trains at 40th Street–Lowery Street station

Sunnyside is served by the 7 train on the New York City Subway's IRT Flushing Line at three local-only stations: 33rd Street–Rawson Street, 40th Street–Lowery Street, and 46th Street–Bliss Street. Express service on the line runs in the peak direction during rush hours between Queensboro Plaza and Mets–Willets Point; express trains pass through the three Sunnyside stations without stopping. The nearest express stop is 61st Street–Woodside, one stop east of the neighborhood.

The Q32, Q39, Q60, Q67, Q104 and B24 buses operate within Sunnyside, with the Q32 and Q60 running along Queens Boulevard.

=== Roads ===
The neighborhood is connected to Manhattan via the Long Island Expressway and the Queens–Midtown Tunnel and to Brooklyn via the Brooklyn–Queens Expressway. Queens Boulevard, a wide multi-lane arterial, runs through the middle of the neighborhood.

=== Bicycle infrastructure ===
In 2018 the New York City Department of Transportation installed parking-protected bicycle lanes on Skillman and 43rd Avenues, replacing curbside parking with separated bike lanes between approximately 43rd Street and 50th Street. The project followed the November 2017 death of cyclist Gelacio Reyes, who was struck by a driver on 43rd Avenue. After several years of public hearings in which Queens Community Board 2 voted against the proposal and Council Member Jimmy Van Bramer initially withheld support, Mayor Bill de Blasio directed the Department of Transportation to proceed and construction began in August 2018.

Citi Bike docking stations were installed across Sunnyside and adjacent Woodside in spring 2022 as part of the system's expansion into western Queens, with about 71 stations planned for the two neighborhoods.

=== Rail and ferry ===
Sunnyside Yard, built by the Pennsylvania Railroad and now owned by Amtrak, occupies the northern edge of the neighborhood and serves as a staging facility for Amtrak and NJ Transit trains using Pennsylvania Station.

A passenger station at Sunnyside has been a long-standing proposal. The East Side Access project's 2001 environmental impact statement contemplated a Long Island Rail Road station at Queens Boulevard and Skillman Avenue, and the Metropolitan Transportation Authority's 2025–2044 20-year needs assessment included a cost evaluation for a station at the same location to be served by both the Long Island Rail Road and Metro-North Railroad following completion of the Penn Station Access project. A Sunnyside station is not part of the funded scope of Penn Station Access, which provides four new Metro-North stations in the East Bronx; that project is currently expected to be substantially complete in 2030.

The nearest NYC Ferry landing is at Hunters Point South in Long Island City, approximately one mile west of southern Sunnyside.

== Notable people ==
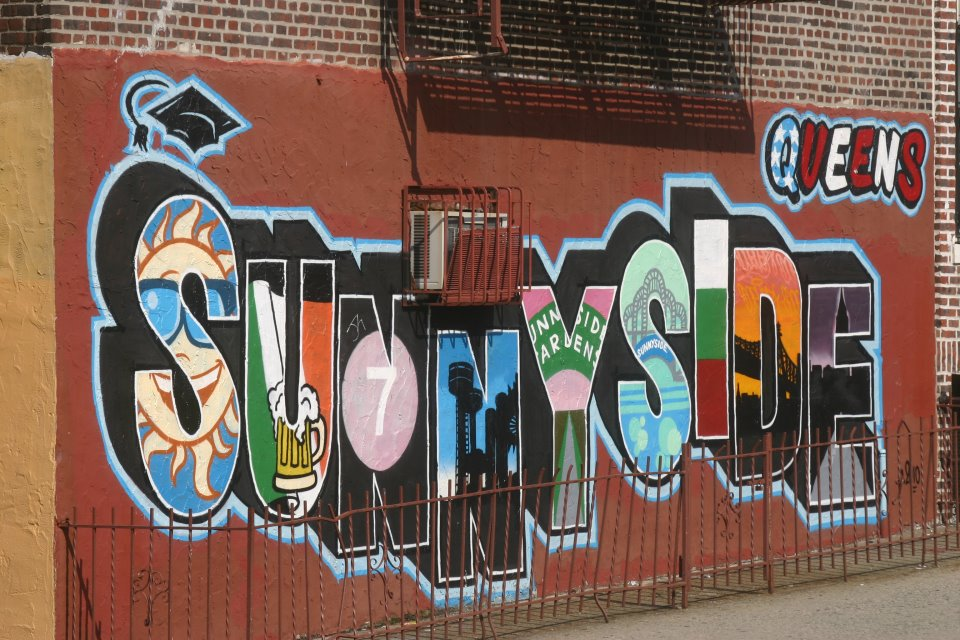
Wall mural in Sunnyside

People who have lived in Sunnyside include:

- Bix Beiderbecke (1903–1931), jazz cornetist, who died in his apartment at 43-30 46th Street on August 6, 1931. A plaque marks the site, and an annual memorial concert is held in his honor.
- Rosebud Ben-Oni, poet and writer who lived in Sunnyside.
- Johanna Beyer (1888–1944), modernist composer who lived in Sunnyside in the 1930s and early 1940s and was an early adopter of percussion and electronic music composition.
- James Caan (1940–2022), actor, who grew up in Sunnyside.
- Perry Como (1912–2001), singer and television personality, listed by The Encyclopedia of New York City as a former resident of Sunnyside Gardens.
- Andrew Cuomo (born 1957), Governor of New York from 2011 to 2021, who lived in a rent-stabilized studio apartment in Sunnyside for several years after graduating from law school in the 1980s.
- Cassie Donegan (born 1997), crowned Miss America 2026, lives in Sunnyside as of 2025.
- Judy Holliday (1921–1965), actress, who lived at 39-45 44th Street with her family between 1926 and 1934.
- Chris Kanyon (1970–2010), professional wrestler, who was found dead in his Sunnyside apartment in April 2010.
- Peter T. King (born 1944), U.S. Representative from New York's 2nd congressional district from 1993 to 2021, who grew up in an Irish Catholic family in Sunnyside, the son of a New York City Police Department lieutenant.
- Lewis Mumford (1895–1990), architectural critic for The New Yorker and a member of the Regional Planning Association of America, who lived in Sunnyside Gardens for nine years.
- Paul Rabinow (1944–2021), anthropologist and University of California, Berkeley professor, who grew up in Sunnyside.
- Suze Rotolo (1943–2011), artist, political activist, and partner of Bob Dylan in the early 1960s, who was raised in Sunnyside after her family moved from Greenwich Village in approximately 1940.
- Dermot Shea (born 1959), New York City Police Commissioner from 2019 to 2021, who grew up in Sunnyside.
- Raphael Soyer (1899–1987), social-realist painter, listed by The Encyclopedia of New York City as a former resident of Sunnyside Gardens.
- Rudy Vallée (1901–1986), bandleader and singer, who lived in Sunnyside earlier in his career.
- Benh Zeitlin (born 1982), filmmaker, who was raised in Sunnyside before his family moved to Westchester County.

The Queens-grown punk rock group the Ramones played some of their earliest shows at the Coventry, originally known as the Popcorn Pub, on Queens Boulevard at 47th Street. According to Ultimate Classic Rock and contemporaneous reporting, Kiss performed its first concert at the same venue on January 30, 1973.

== In popular culture ==
Notable films and television shows shot in the area include:

John Turturro filming The Last Living Pickpocket in New York at EZ Pawn Corp

- 30 Rock
- Blue Bloods
- Elementary
- Person of Interest
- Poker Face (TV series)
- Saturday Night Live
- Spider-Man: Homecoming
- Spider-Man: No Way Home
- Sunnyside (American TV series)
- The Only Living Pickpocket in New York
- Unforgettable
