= Joe Sabba Park =

Small park in Queens, New York

Coordinates: 40°44′34″N 73°54′57″W

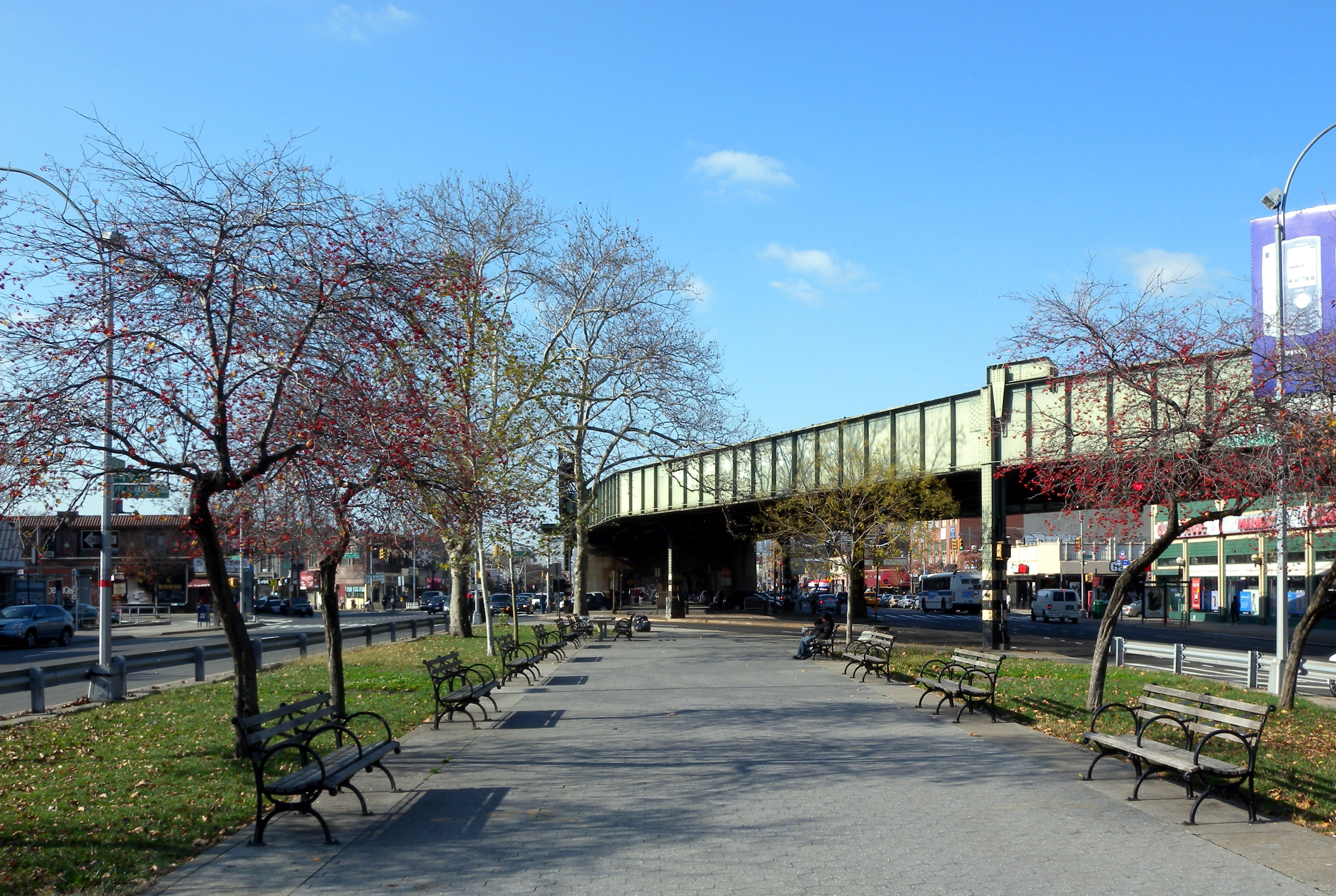
Joe Sabba Park on an Autumn day

Joe Sabba Park is a 0.47-acre (1,900 m^{2}) New York City public park maintained and run by the New York City Department of Parks and Recreation, in the Sunnyside neighborhood of Queens in New York City. It is located at the intersection of Roosevelt Avenue and Queens Boulevard, between 48th and 49th Streets. The park is named after Joe Sabba, a veteran of World War II and local activist from Sunnyside.

== Description ==
The park has several benches with tables made of granite along a narrow path through its center decorated by shrubbery on its sides. At its center is a memorial statue, designed in black Vermont granite by architect Dominick Segrete. Beside the monument are the flags of the City of New York, the New York City Department of Parks and Recreation, and the United States.

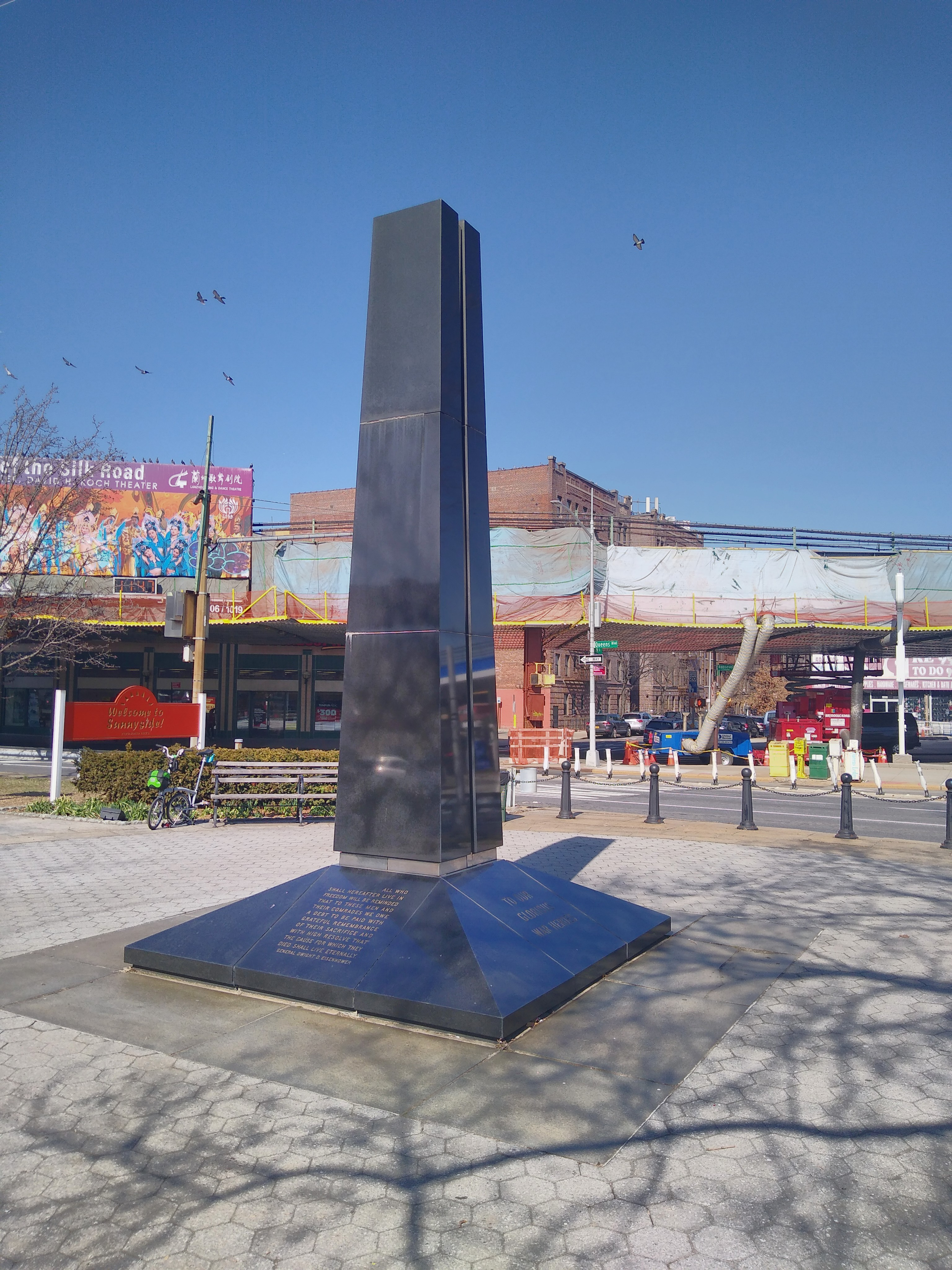
Veterans Memorial Statue

== History ==
=== Early history (1913–1977) ===
On 18 October 1913, the City of New York purchased the land between 48th and 49th Streets, at the intersection of Roosevelt Avenue and Queens Boulevard. It was first used for mall space, which became known as "Roosevelt Plaza" by the locals. After 20 years, on 18 October 1933, the land was given to the New York City Parks Department and repurposed as a park. Its area would be increased in 1938, at the order of C.B. Williams, then president of the landscape division of Queens Parks, a subdivision of the New York City Department of Parks and Recreation for Queens County. In 1941, following the Japanese attacks on Pearl Harbor and the US entry in the Second World War, the park was named Veterans Memorial Park to honor the veterans who fought in World War I, as well as the soldiers fighting in World War II.

=== Renaming (1977–2000) ===
In 1977, the park experienced a few changes. It was renamed Sunnyside Veterans Triangle; and through the efforts of Joe Sabba, a local activist, a new statue was installed in the park to honor the veterans of American wars.

On 20 June 2000, the park, then named Veterans Memorial Park, was renamed in Sabba's honor by New York City Mayor Rudy Giuliani.
