= Queens Community Board 2 =

Community Board in Queens, New York, US

Queens Community District 2 Queens Community Board 2
- Community District
- Country: United States
- State: New York
- City: New York City
- Borough: Queens
- Neighborhoods: list: Hunters Point; Long Island City; Sunnyside; Woodside

Government
  - Type: Community board
  - Body: Queens Community Board 2
  - Chairperson: Anatole Ashraf
  - District Manager: Debra Markell Kleinert

Area
  - Total: 5.0 sq mi (13 km^{2})

Population (2016)
  - Total: 139,088
  - Density: 28,000/sq mi (11,000/km^{2})

Ethnicity
  - African-American: 1.3%
  - Asian: 35.2%
  - Hispanic and Latino Americans: 33.2%
  - White: 28.1%
  - Others: 2.3%
- Time zone: UTC−5 (Eastern)
  - Summer (DST): UTC−4 (EDT)
- ZIP codes: 11101, 11104, 11377 and 11378
- Area codes: 718, 347, and 929, and 917
- Police Precincts: 108th (website)
- Website: www.nyc.gov/site/queenscb2/index.page

The Queens Community Board 2 is a local advisory group in New York City, encompassing the neighborhoods of Hunters Point, Long Island City, Maspeth, Sunnyside, and Woodside, in the borough of Queens. It is delimited by the East River on the west; Bridge Plaza North, the Long Island Rail Road and Northern Boulevard on the north; New York Connecting Railroad on the east; and Newtown Creek on the south.

== Demographics ==
As of the 2000 United States census, the Community Board had a population of 109,920, up from 94,845 in 1990 and 88,930 in 1980.

Of these (as of 2000), 33,877 (30.8%) were non-Hispanic White, 2,158 (2.0%) were African-American, 29,380 (26.7%) were Asian or Pacific Islander, 184 (0.2%) were American Indian or Native Alaskan, 550 (0.5%) were of some other race, 3,732 (3.4%) were non-Hispanic of two or more races, and 40,039 (36.4%) were of Hispanic origins.
