= Robert Sterl =

German painter

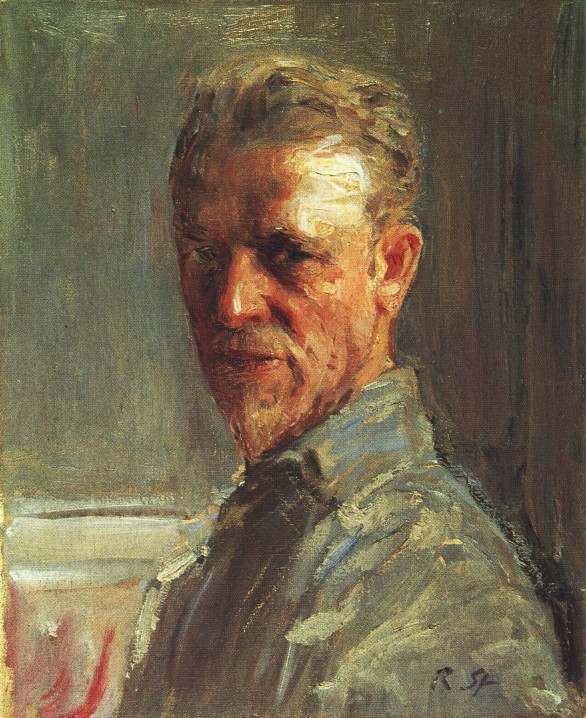
Self-portrait (1919)

Robert Hermann Sterl (23 June 1867 – 10 January 1932) was a German painter and graphic artist.

== Life ==
Sterl was born in Großdobritz, now part of Dresden, the son of a stonemason. From 1881 to 1888, he attended the Dresden Academy of Fine Arts, where he studied under Leon Pohle and Julius Scholtz, later becoming a master student of Ferdinand Pauwels. A stay at the artists' colony in Goppeln near Bannewitz introduced him to impressionism and plein air painting.

After leaving Pauwels' studio, he worked as a landscape painter and portraitist and, until 1904, operated a private painting school for women. In 1893, he became one of the founding members of the Dresden Secession. He was appointed a Professor at the Academy in 1906, where he taught until 1931, and became an associate member of the Berlin Secession in 1909. From 1913 to 1930, he was a member of the Dresdner Galeriekommission and, from 1920, had a seat on the Gallery Advisory Board, both of which positions enabled him to help young artists. When Gotthardt Kuehl died in 1915, Sterl took over his Master Class. During World War I, he worked as a war painter, on the Western Front in 1915 and the southern front in the Dolomites in 1917. After the war, he bought a house in Struppen and built a spacious studio there.

=== Work and legacy ===
In addition to the usual impressionist subject matter, he painted musicians and workers, especially quarrymen. He was sympathetic to liberal causes, producing many socially conscious works; some of which are set in Russia, where he had travelled briefly before the war. Two of his paintings were labelled "degenerate art" in 1937 and removed from the Galerie Neue Meister. During the GDR years, his works were praised for some of the same reasons the Nazis had condemned them.

Among Sterl's works are portraits of art collectors such as Felix Bondi, Dr. Gustav von Klemperer,Dr. Victor von Klemperer and Severin Eisenberger that are currently listed on the German Lost Art Foundation as missing and the object of search requests.

He died in Struppen after a long illness and was buried at his home, bequeathing his estate to the Academy for the purpose of discovering and promoting new artists. The "Robert and Helene Sterl Foundation" was created just before his death in 1931 and, since 1981, the home has been operated as a museum and research facility. Beginning in 1997, the Foundation and related organizations have awarded the "Robert Sterl Prize" to a master student at the Academy. The prize includes €3,000 and an exhibit at the museum.

== Selected works ==
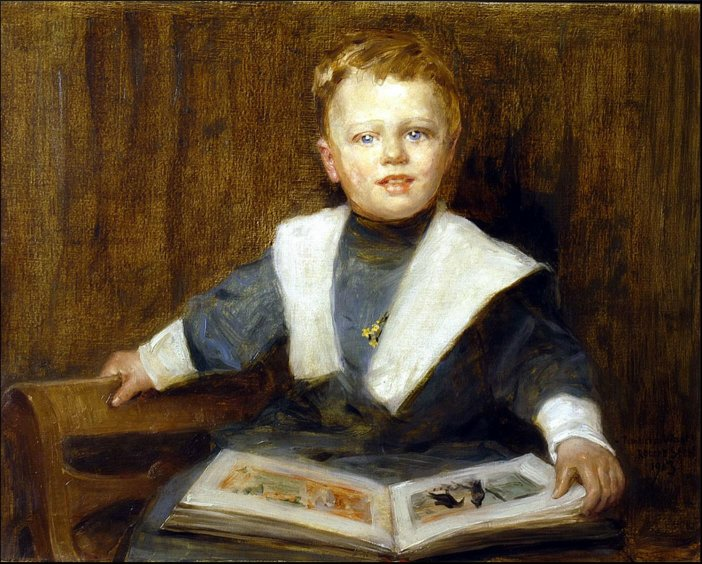
Portrait of Wastl (1903)

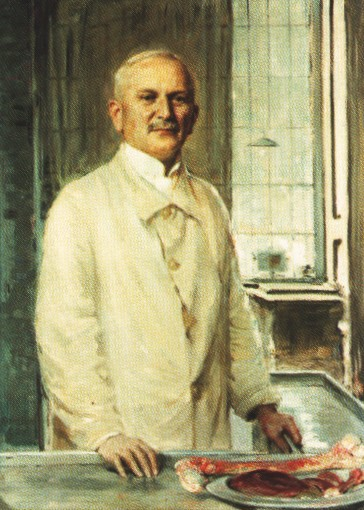
Portrait of Christian Georg Schmorl (1921)

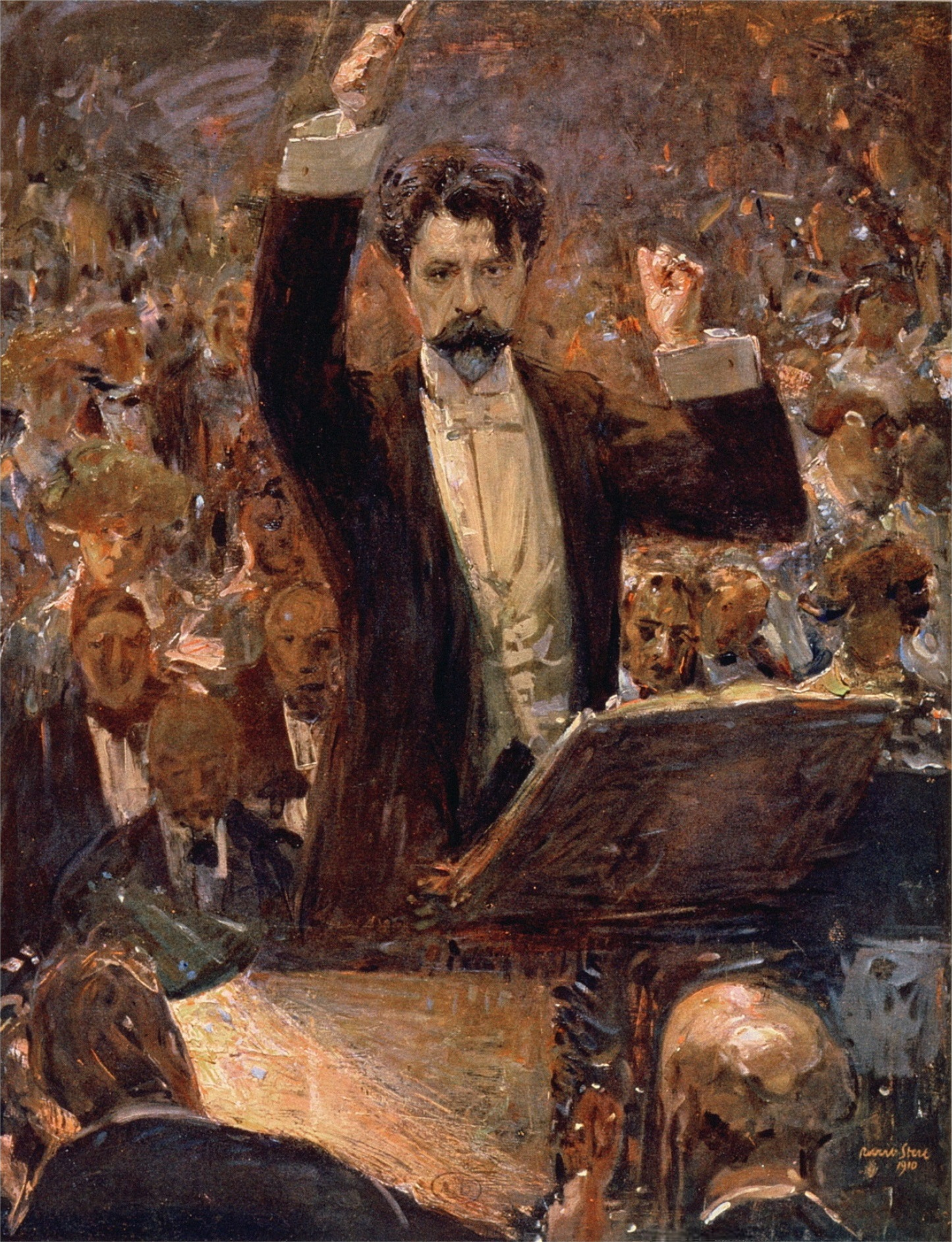
Portrait of Arthur Nikisch (1910)

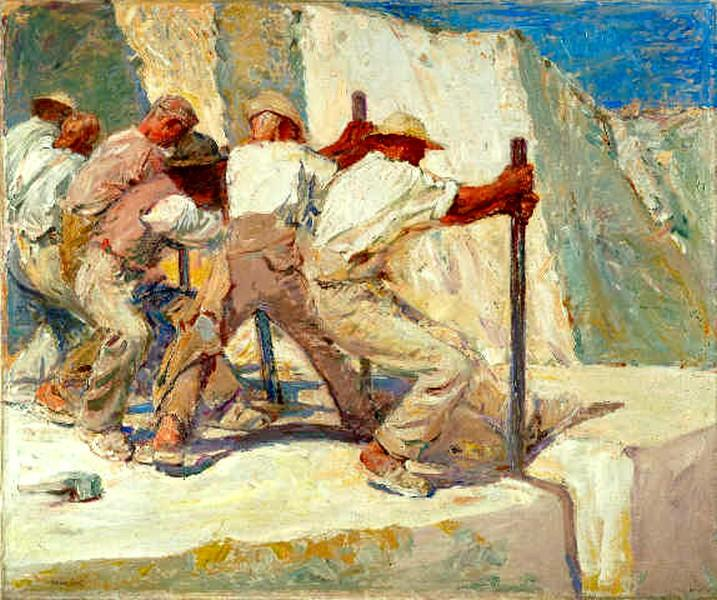
The Quarrymen (1911)

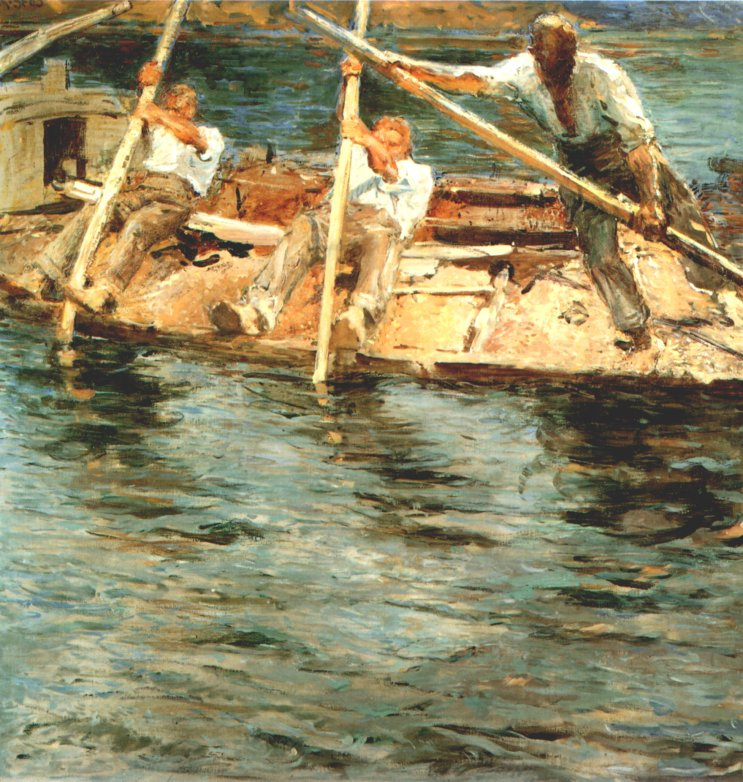
Dredging the Elbe (1905)

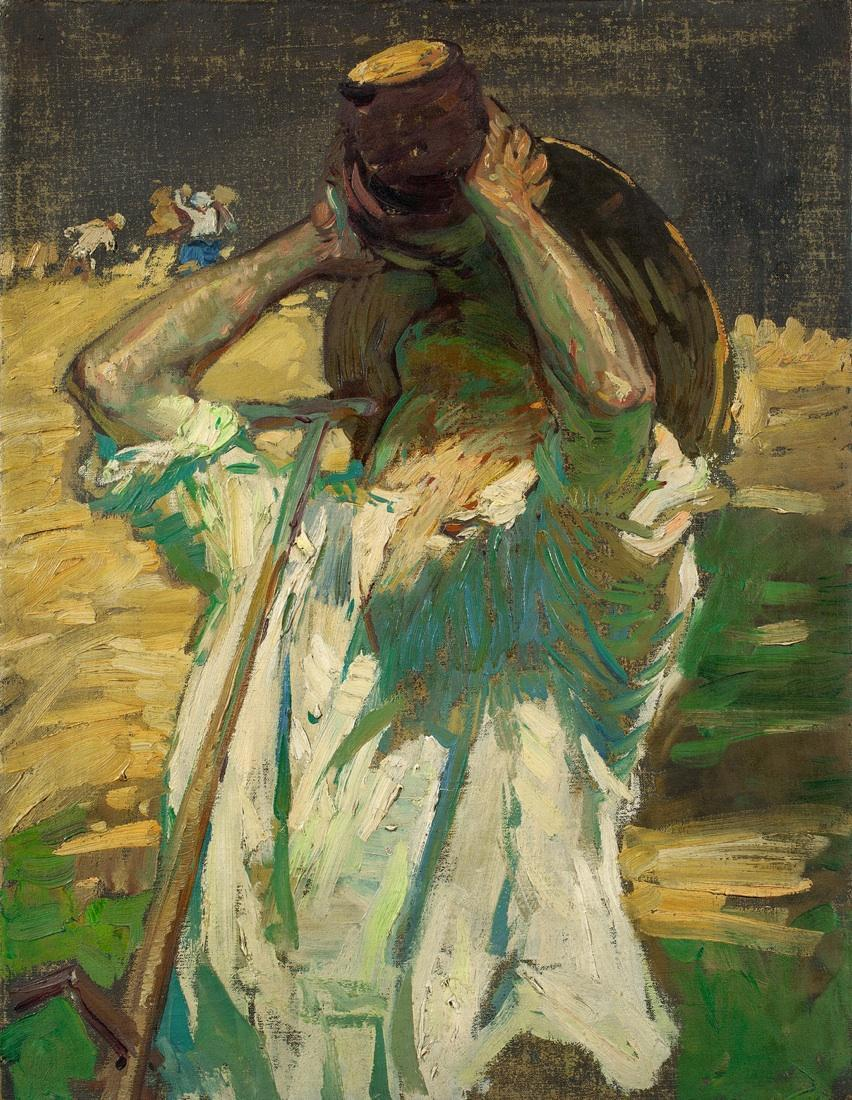
Harvest Drink (1903)
