= Klemperer (surname) =

Klemperer is a German-language occupational surname literally meaning "tinker". It is suggested that in the case of the conductor's immediate family the original name was Klopper - one who knocks on doors to get people to go to Synagogue.

The surname may refer to:

- Members of the prominent German family:
  - Otto Klemperer (1885–1973), Jewish German-born conductor and composer
    - Johanna Klemperer, his wife, known professionally as Johanna Geisler
    - Werner Klemperer (1920–2000), German-American actor, their son, best known for playing Colonel Klink in Hogan's Heroes, and musician
  - Georg Klemperer (1865–1946), Jewish German medical consultant, brother of Victor and cousin to the conductor Otto Klemperer, advised his cousin in America concerning his brain tumour.
  - Victor Klemperer (1881–1960), Jewish German businessman, journalist, author and literary critic (Professor of Literature)
  - Otto Klemperer (physicist) (1899–1987), German physicist and cousin to the conductor Otto Klemperer
- David Klemperer (born 1980), German beach volleyball player
- Felix Klemperer (1866–1932), German internist
- Gustav Klemperer von Klemenau (1852–1926), German banker
- James von Klemperer (born 1957), American architect
- Klemens von Klemperer (1916–2012), German-American historian
- Paul Klemperer (born 1956), English economist and Edgeworth Professor of Economics at Oxford University
- Ralph von Klemperer, German banker
- Simon Klemperer, Geophysicist and Stanford University professor, brother of Paul Klemperer
- Viktor Klemperer von Klemenau (1876–1943), German banker
- Walter G. Klemperer, American chemist, professor at Columbia University and the University of Illinois Urbana Champaign
- Wilhelm Klemperer (1839–1912), Rabbi
- William Klemperer (1927–2017), American chemist and Harvard University professor
- Wolfgang Klemperer (1893–1965), German-American physicist and aerospace engineer
