= Klemperer (disambiguation) =

Klemperer, Klemplerer, Kemplerer, Kemperer, may refer to:

- Klemperer (surname), a German surname
- Klemperer rosette, an orbital configuration of multiple objects
- 134348 Klemperer, the asteroid Klemperer, an asteroid in the Main Belt, the 134348th asteroid registered
- Klemperer – Ein Leben in Deutschland, a German TV show
