= Sunnyside Shines =

Business improvement district in Queens, New York City

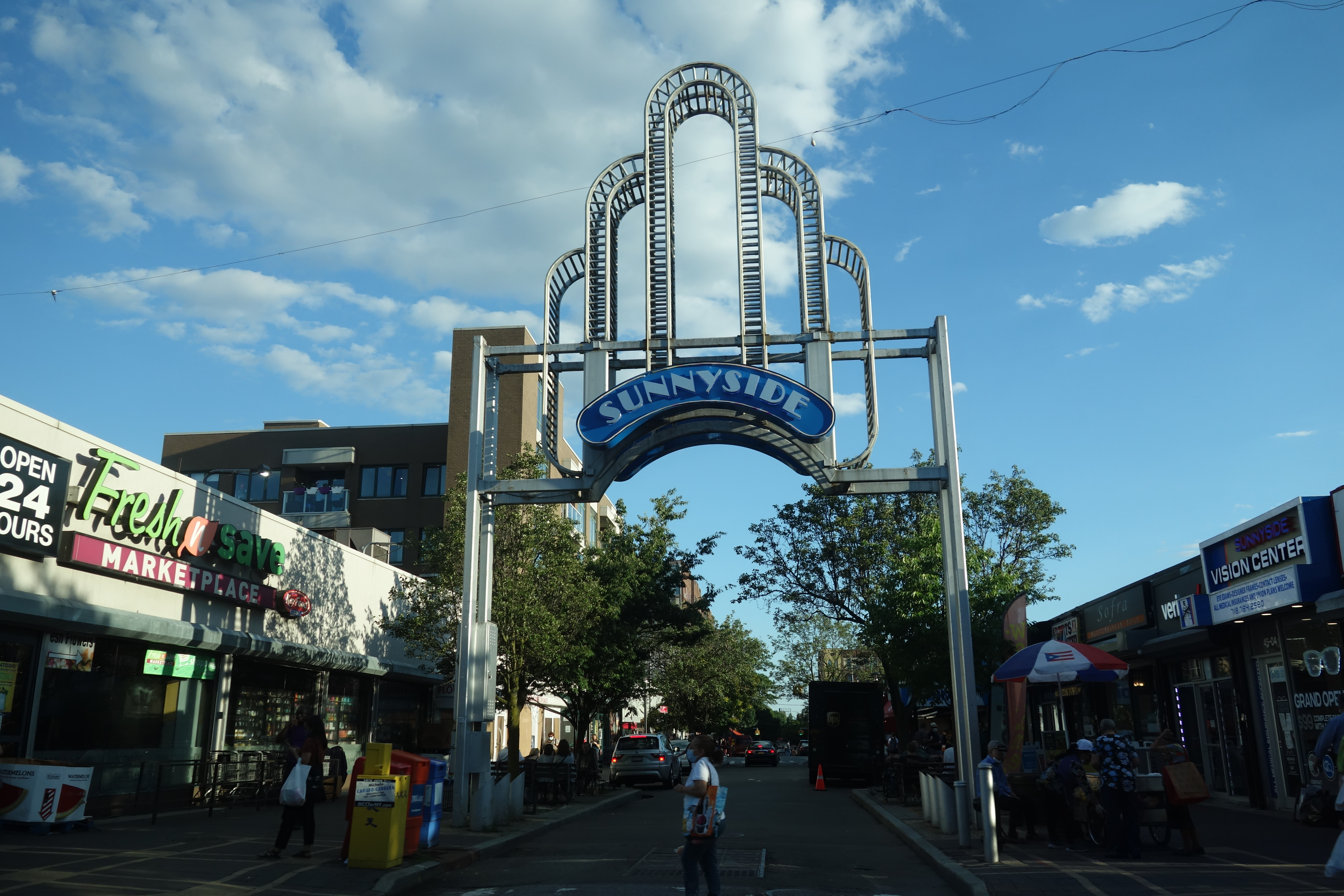
- The BID controls the color-changing lights on the Sunnyside Arch over 46th Street.
- Formation: September 5, 2007; 19 years ago
- Type: Business improvement district
- Headquarters: 43rd Street, Sunnyside, Queens, New York City
- Coordinates: 40.743°N 73.9216°W
- Region served: Sunnyside, Queens
- Executive director: Dirk McCall de Palomá
- Budget: US$947,900 (fiscal year 2025)
- Website: sunnysideshines.org

Sunnyside Shines (officially the Sunnyside Shines Business Improvement District) is a business improvement district (BID) in the Sunnyside neighborhood of Queens, New York City. Signed into law in 2007, the district includes commercial properties along Queens Boulevard and Greenpoint Avenue. Like other New York City BIDs, it is funded by an assessment on property owners within its boundaries, is overseen by the city's Department of Small Business Services (SBS), and provides supplemental sanitation, streetscape maintenance, holiday lighting, marketing, and public programming.

The BID lights the Sunnyside Arch and manages two public plazas beneath the elevated 7 train, and it organizes neighborhood events including the Taste of Sunnyside restaurant crawl, Sunnyside Restaurant Week, and the annual SunnyPride celebration. In the 2020s it took part in the city-supported Connected Corridors program, through which it started an outdoor night market and installed new lighting on Greenpoint Avenue.

== History ==
=== Background ===
A business improvement district is a defined area in which property owners self-fund supplemental services and improvements beyond those the city provides. New York City's BID program began in 1984 with the establishment of the Union Square Partnership, the city's first business improvement district. By the mid-2020s the Department of Small Business Services oversaw about 75 such districts, which together invested some $194 million in their commercial corridors in fiscal year 2023. Each district is financed by an assessment on the properties within it.

=== Formation ===
The district's formation took about five years. In February 2007, the New York City Planning Commission approved an application by the Department of Small Business Services to establish the BID, which was to cover 92 tax lots and roughly 290 businesses, along Queens Boulevard and Roosevelt and Greenpoint avenues. The commission set a first-year budget of $300,000, to be raised through an assessment of $23 per linear foot of frontage on commercial properties (capped at $0.007 per dollar of assessed value) and $1 a year on residential properties; Queens Community Board 2 had endorsed the plan by a vote of 30 to 0 with one abstention.

Mayor Michael Bloomberg signed the district into law on September 5, 2007, the thirteenth BID created during his administration. As enacted, it included 92 properties along Queens Boulevard from 38th to 50th streets, Greenpoint Avenue from 42nd to 48th streets, and South Roosevelt Avenue from 48th to 50th streets. The name "Sunnyside Shines" was proposed by Lillian "Lily" Gavin, a vice president of the Sunnyside Chamber of Commerce and an owner of Dazie's Restaurant. The chamber's president, John Vogt, became the BID's first board chairman. Sunnyside Shines began operating in April 2008 and moved into renovated offices the following year.

== District and governance ==
=== District ===
The Sunnyside Shines district within New York City.

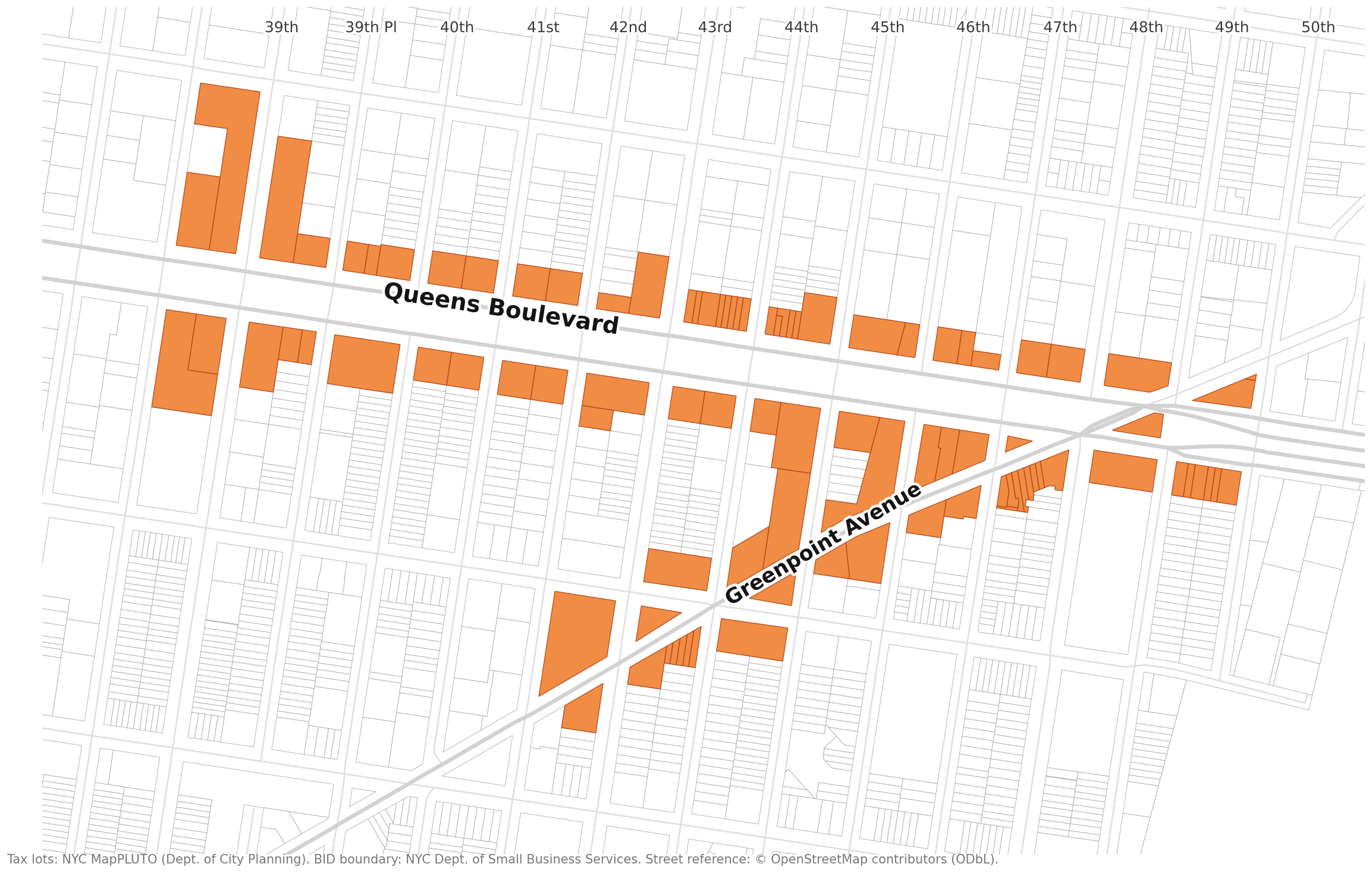
Tax lots in the Sunnyside Shines district (orange) along Queens Boulevard and Greenpoint Avenue.

Sunnyside Shines covers the properties fronting Queens Boulevard between 38th and 50th streets and a stretch of Greenpoint Avenue running southeast from Queens Boulevard, an area the district says contains about 350 businesses. Its service area measured about 18,290 linear feet of frontage in fiscal year 2025. The BID partnered with the Department of Small Business Services, under its Avenue NYC grant program, on a 2020 Commercial District Needs Assessment of the neighborhood's commercial corridors, surveying more than 670 merchants, shoppers, and other stakeholders for the study.

=== Governance and leadership ===
The district is governed by a board whose members represent property owners, commercial tenants, residents, local nonprofits, the community board, and elected officials; several seats are held ex officio by representatives of public officials, and the board has numbered around 17 members. Board members are elected at an annual public meeting, which the BID has held since its early years and which local media have covered regularly. Day-to-day operations are run by a small staff.

As of 2026, the executive director is Dirk McCall de Palomá, who took the position in January 2022. He succeeded Jaime-Faye Bean, who led the BID for about five years before stepping down in December 2021 to join the James Beard Foundation; during her tenure Bean co-founded the small-business relief group Queens Together and organized fundraising for workers displaced by two fires in the district. McCall de Palomá had previously directed civic engagement for the Queens district attorney and run the Greenwich Village-Chelsea Chamber of Commerce. Earlier executive directors included James Bray, who led the BID in its early years, and Rachel Thieme, who was hired in 2012 and served through at least 2016. The board's founding chairman, John Vogt, served until his death, after which Maria Medina became chair in 2023. Arthur "Artie" Weiner was the board's longtime treasurer until his death; in 2026 his son Jeff was elected to complete his term.

=== Funding ===
Sunnyside Shines is funded mainly by an assessment on district property owners, supplemented by government grants and fundraising. Its annual budget was about $300,000 in its early years and roughly $462,000 by 2016. In fiscal year 2025 it reported assessment revenue of $360,000, total revenue of about $947,900, and expenses of about $977,215, placing it among the city's smaller BIDs. Beyond the assessment, the BID has received a $100,000 SBS small-BID grant for marketing and tree-bed work in 2022, 2023, and 2024, along with a $100,000 public-realm grant. It has also received funding from members of Congress and from state and city officials, including $260,000 provided by U.S. Representative Nydia Velázquez and city-council funding for cultural programming.

== Services ==
=== Sanitation and streetscape ===
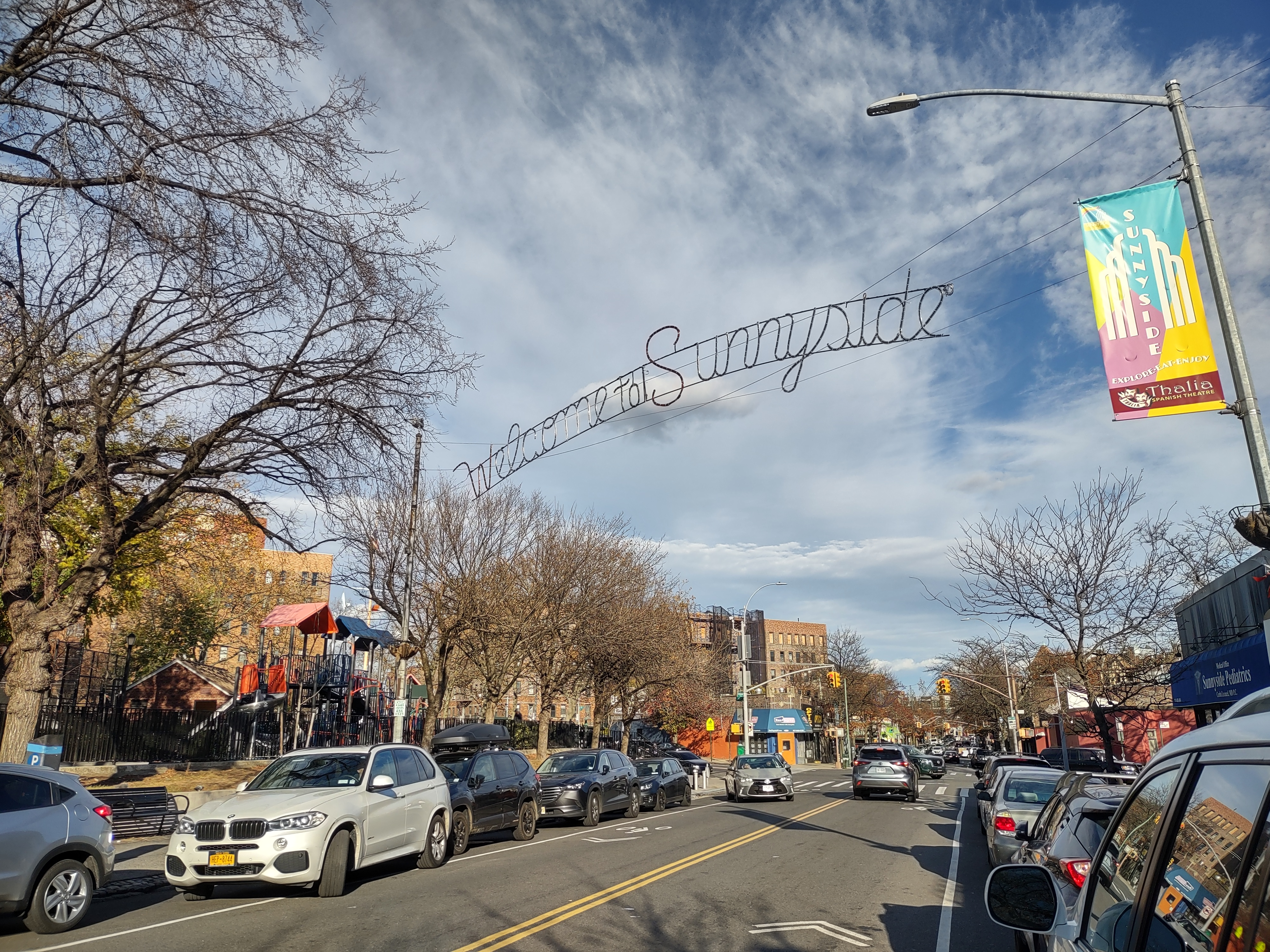
The BID installs "Welcome to Sunnyside" skyline signs and seasonal lighting along Greenpoint Avenue and Queens Boulevard.

Sunnyside Shines contracts with a private firm for supplemental sanitation, including sidewalk sweeping, trash collection, and graffiti removal. It extended the service to seven days a week in 2012 and began clearing graffiti monthly in 2013. In fiscal year 2022–2023 it reported collecting 61,380 bags of trash and clearing graffiti 3,083 times. A street-tree program launched in 2014 has installed protective guards around tree beds, widened planting pits, and planted new trees along the district's shopping streets. The BID also hangs flower baskets along Queens Boulevard and Greenpoint Avenue and installs snowflake-shaped holiday lighting from November through January.

=== Public spaces ===
Since 2014 the BID has managed two public plazas beneath the elevated 7 train, Bliss Plaza at 46th Street and Lowery Plaza at 40th Street, which the New York City Department of Transportation created under its Neighborhood Plaza Program and for which the BID is the designated plaza partner. It maintains the plazas and runs their programming, and when they opened it hired the Neighborhood Plaza Partnership, a nonprofit staffed by formerly homeless and formerly incarcerated New Yorkers, to clean and secure the spaces. Sunnyside Shines also controls the lighting of the Sunnyside Arch, the neighborhood's steel arch over 46th Street, and can set its color-changing LEDs for holidays and seasons.

In 2023, under the city Department of Transportation's Open Streets program, the BID proposed and helped operate an Open Street on 46th Street, the block beneath the Sunnyside Arch. From that spring through October, the street was closed to most through traffic during the day, with BID staff moving barriers to admit delivery vehicles. Community Board 2 endorsed the plan and many residents backed it, but some business owners and the advocacy group Queens Streets for All opposed it, questioning its effect on deliveries and local commerce.

In 2024 Sunnyside Shines was one of three BIDs chosen for Connected Corridors, a program run by the city with the Association for Neighborhood and Housing Development and the Urban Design Forum to help districts in under-invested commercial areas develop public-space plans and improvements. Working with the firm di Domenico + Partners and the Queens Lighting Collective, the BID produced a neighborhood vision plan, piloted a lighting installation at Sabba Park, and held its first night market beneath the 7 train. The program also led the BID to secure permits for further markets and funding for a new lighting installation on Greenpoint Avenue. Completed in 2025 with a $100,000 public-realm grant from the Department of Small Business Services, the "Sunnyside Lights" project fitted the avenue's poles with illuminated sun motifs and programmable lighting. The BID can set the lights to the colors of the national flags of the countries its merchants come from, among them Colombia, Peru, the Dominican Republic, Ecuador, the Philippines, and Korea, and it calls the corridor an "Avenue of the World."

=== Marketing and business support ===
The BID's promotional work has included printed neighborhood business maps; a 2014 edition of 15,000 copies was distributed to real-estate offices, hotels, and other local businesses.

The BID has also organized emergency assistance for district businesses. A five-alarm fire on December 13, 2018, destroyed a row of businesses on Queens Boulevard between 45th and 46th streets, among them a UPS Store, Zen Yai Noodles & Coffee, Sidetracks, and Better Line Hardware. Sunnyside Shines established a Sunnyside Fire Relief Fund that raised more than $120,000, including over $24,000 on GoFundMe in the hours after the fire. The BID said the money would be distributed as cash aid to roughly 100 workers at the six businesses. A benefit days later drew about a thousand people, with food donated by some 30 restaurants.

== Events and cultural programming ==
Taste of Sunnyside is the BID's annual food event, featuring local restaurants. It began as a ticketed indoor tasting; the BID organized an early edition for October 2010 and ran it in its first years in cooperation with the Sunnyside Chamber of Commerce. The BID later moved it outdoors beneath the elevated 7 train tracks, where a May 2014 edition drew 31 area restaurants and more than 600 people. Since 2021 it has been held as a neighborhood "restaurant crawl," with participating establishments serving samples at their own storefronts. Promoted as the fifteenth annual Taste of Sunnyside, the 2025 edition drew a record 67 participating businesses and about 1,200 ticket-holders. The BID also holds an annual Sunnyside Restaurant Week, offering prix-fixe meals at more than 50 restaurants, along with a Spa and Salon Fest and a fitness series.

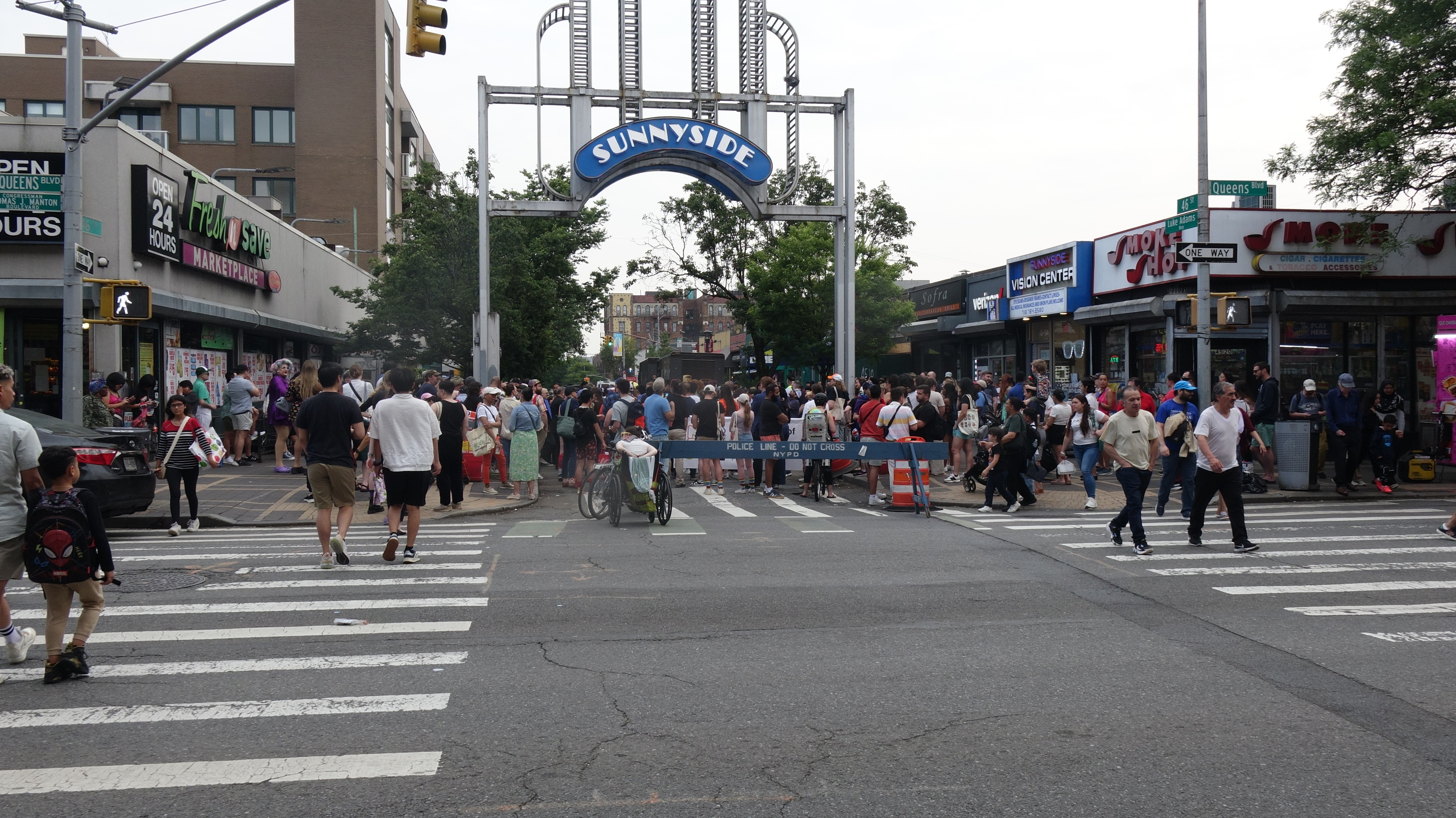
Crowds by the Sunnyside Arch during SunnyPride, the BID's annual LGBTQ celebration, in 2025

Since 2022 the BID has organized SunnyPride, an annual LGBTQ celebration held each June with community partners including Queens Community Board 2. Centered on a march along Queens Boulevard and a Queer Makers Market, it drew a reported 3,000 participants at its fifth edition in 2026. Through its Sunnyside Community Cultural Initiative, the BID hosts weekly music and dance performances in the plazas from May through October and holds a Día de Muertos event, a Bix Beiderbecke Memorial Jazz Festival, and other annual cultural celebrations. These have included the neighborhood's first Colombian Independence Day celebration, held at Bliss Plaza in 2022. The BID suspended in-person programming during the COVID-19 pandemic and resumed plaza events in 2021.

The BID has partnered with the Queens Night Market on outdoor markets in Sunnyside since 2018, when the two organizations ran summer markets and a holiday market in Bliss Plaza. In October 2024 it launched the first Sunnyside Night Market at Lowery Plaza beneath the 7 train, which its organizers said drew more than 500 people and 20 local vendors.

== See also ==
- Sunnyside Arch
- Grand Central Partnership
- Bryant Park Corporation
