= International Urban Design Conference =

The International Urban Design Conference is an international event held in Australia dedicated to Urban Design. The International Urban Design Conference was established in 2007 on the Gold Coast Queensland. Subsequent conferences have been held in Canberra, Sydney, Melbourne, Adelaide and Brisbane

Urban Design Australia also uses a Blog, Facebook, Twitter and LinkedIn to engage with its community. There are over 20,000 subscribers to the site which also includes a podcast archive of over 400 presentations by UD practitioners. The 2016 Conference was held in Brisbane Australia.

== See also ==
- Institute for Urban Design
