= Sunnyside Arch =

Landmark in Sunnyside, Queens

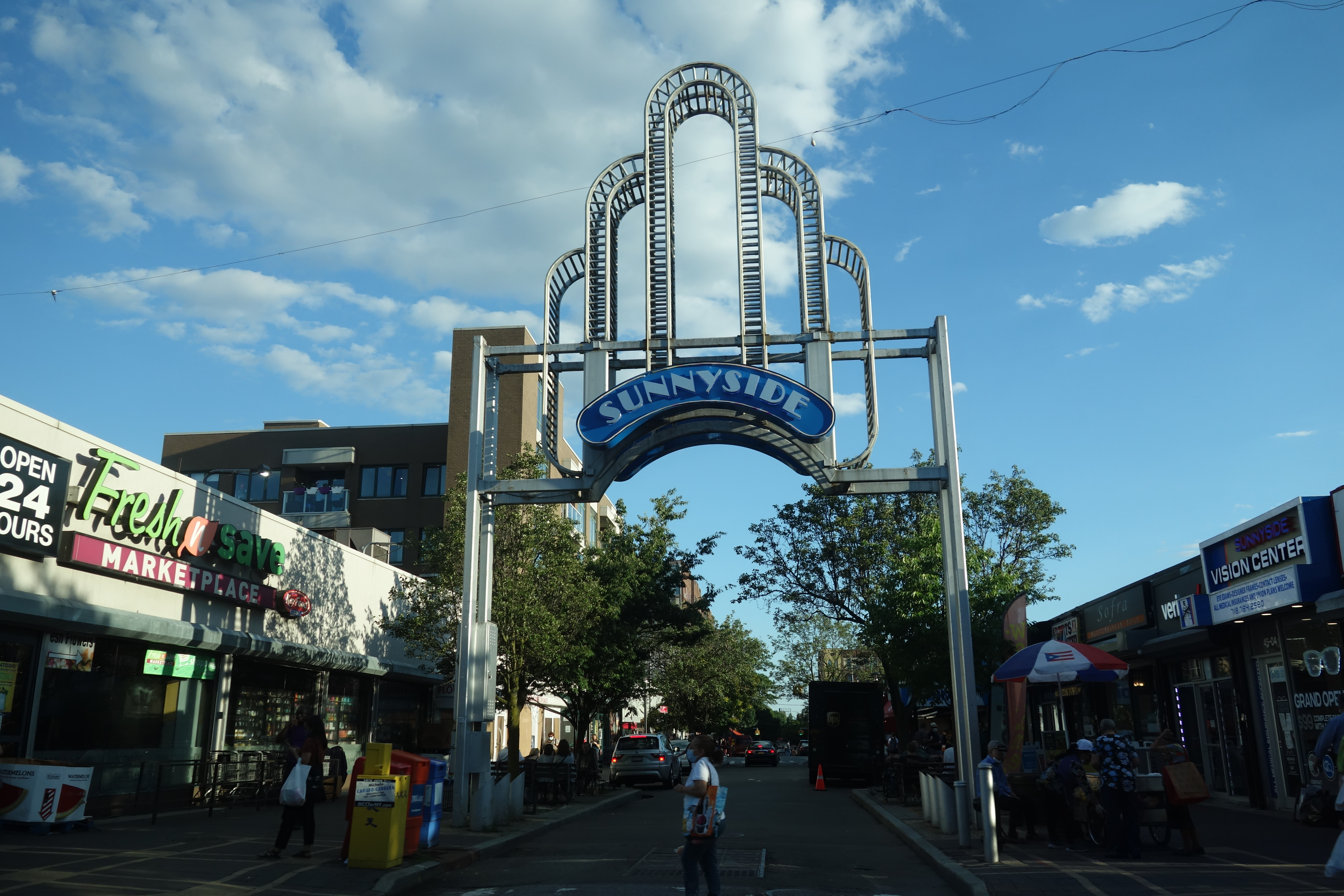
- The arch over 46th Street in 2021
- Interactive map of the Sunnyside Arch area

General information
- Architectural style: Art Deco-inspired
- Location: 46th Street at Queens Boulevard, Sunnyside, Queens, New York City, US
- Coordinates: 40°44′34″N 73°55′08″W
- Completed: 1983
- Renovated: 2009, 2018

Height
- Height: 25 ft (7.6 m)

The Sunnyside Arch is an illuminated steel arch spanning 46th Street just south of Queens Boulevard in the Sunnyside neighborhood of Queens, New York City, United States. Erected in 1983 to help revitalize the 46th Street commercial corridor, the roughly two-story structure carries the neighborhood's name in lights and is one of Sunnyside's best-known landmarks.

Built by a local civic group that later disbanded, the arch fell into disrepair within a few years of its construction. Publicly funded repairs secured over the following decades returned it to use, including a $500,000 refurbishment completed in 2009 and a conversion to programmable LED lighting in 2018, though the new lights failed within months. It has been described as a symbol of Sunnyside and a "gateway to Queens".

== Design ==
The arch spans 46th Street on the south side of its intersection with Queens Boulevard. It rises about two stories above street level and is 25 feet (7.6 m) tall. The arch is built of Art Deco-inspired steel tubing that frames the word "Sunnyside" across the top of the span. The lettering and frame were originally studded with hundreds of small light bulbs that lit the structure at night.

The arch was first cream-colored. In the restoration completed in 2009 it was repainted so that the neighborhood's name stands against a baby-blue background. Benches and street trees stand around the arch, at the head of the 46th Street shopping strip, which runs south from Queens Boulevard toward Greenpoint Avenue.

== History ==
The arch was built in 1983 by the Gateway Community Restoration Development Corporation, a local community group, to help revitalize a struggling commercial strip along 46th Street. The many small bulbs proved difficult to replace, and the arch fell into disuse after only a few years of regular illumination. By 1994 it had been dark for about two years, and its sponsoring group, Gateway Community Restoration, had closed for lack of funding; Community Board 2 weighed a vote to demolish the arch but shelved it after the borough president committed about $44,000 toward repairs. Over the following years it deteriorated, showing peeling paint, graffiti, rust, and faulty wiring by the time officials took up its restoration.

In 2001, Queens Borough President Claire Shulman designated $75,000 from her discretionary budget toward repairs. The effort was supported by the Sunnyside Chamber of Commerce, local residents, City Council member Walter L. McCaffrey, and Community Board 2. In 2003, a proposal by Borough President Helen Marshall to direct $77,000 to the arch was rejected by the city's Office of Management and Budget, which ruled that the work was not a capital expense, and residents remained divided over whether to restore the arch or demolish it. In January 2005, Marshall and City Council member Eric Gioia announced $450,000 in city funding for a full restoration of the arch and improvements to the surrounding commercial corridor. The work was delayed for several years, in part pending the creation of the Sunnyside Shines business improvement district in 2007, and as of mid-2007 little visible progress had been made.

The restoration was completed in April 2009 at a cost of about $500,000, with $300,000 from Marshall's office, $150,000 from Gioia's office, and $50,000 from State Assemblywoman Catherine Nolan. Workers repainted the steel tubing and removed the old bulbs, with a plan to install programmable colored LED lights comparable to those atop the Empire State Building. The project also added new benches, bike racks, and trees around the arch.

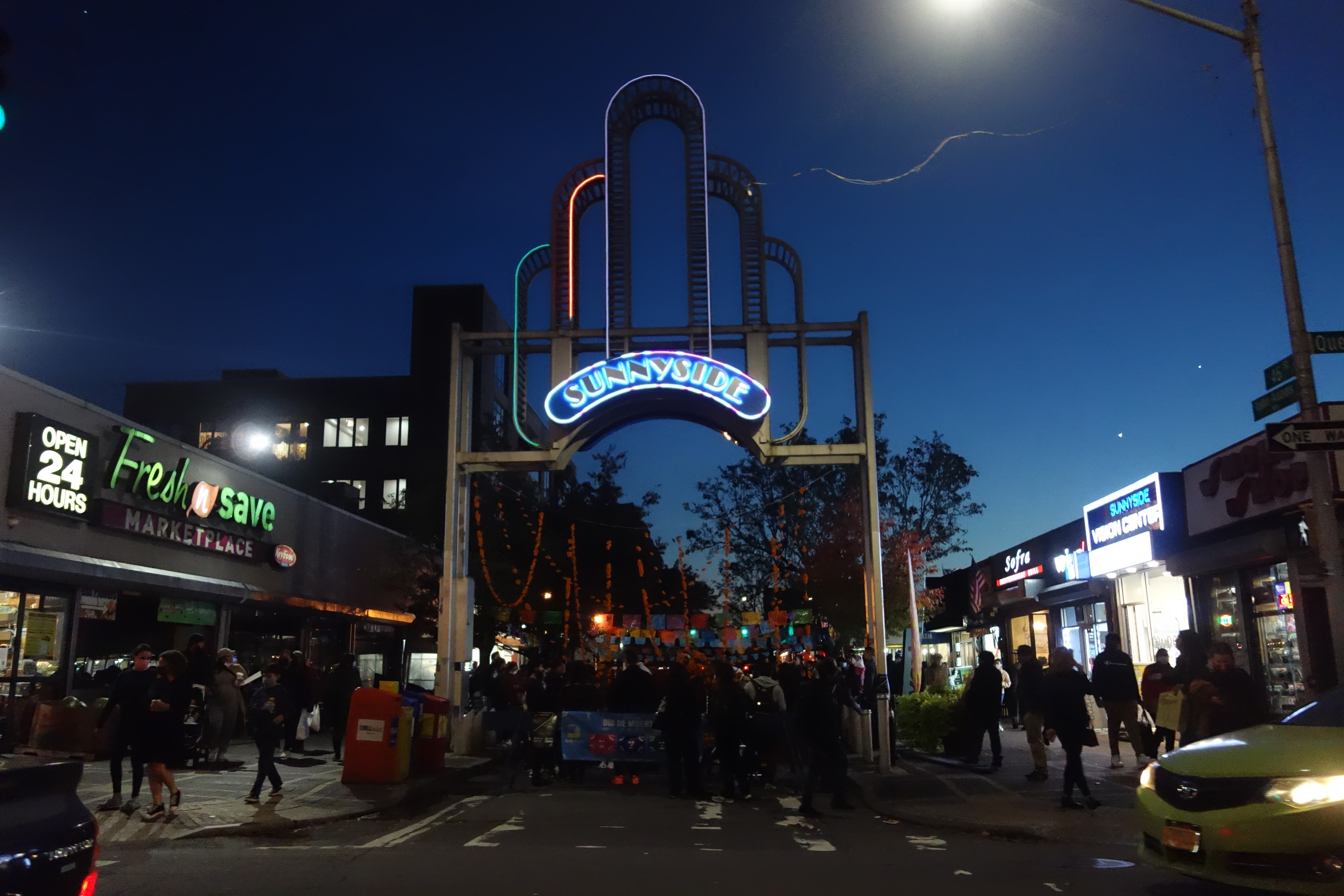
The arch illuminated at night in 2021

In 2015, the city co-named the 46th Street block at Queens Boulevard "Luke Adams Way" for Luke Adams, a Sunnyside Chamber of Commerce leader who had helped build the arch and campaigned for its repair before his death in November 2014. The City Council approved the co-naming in January 2015, and the sign was unveiled that August. In 2017, City Council member Jimmy Van Bramer allocated $15,000 toward a $17,000 project to replace the arch's neon backlighting, added in 2011 and prone to failure, with programmable digital LED lights that the Sunnyside Shines district could set to different colors for holidays and seasons. In July 2018, the arch's corroded "Sunnyside" signs were replaced with laser-cut replicas fitted with the new LED lights. Within months the lights failed, which Sunnyside Shines attributed to water that had seeped through the protective epoxy, leaving the arch dark.

== Reception ==
The arch has drawn mixed reactions since its construction. A 1994 Newsday report quoted a longtime Sunnyside resident who said the arch's lights "gave it a Coney Island atmosphere" but came to value the structure as "a meeting place". A 2001 New York Times account reported that it had been called "tacky and ill conceived" and likened "derogatorily, to Coney Island", and quoted McCaffrey, who described it as "an overly grand gesture in that it was not matched with reality". A longtime resident said, "I've hated it from the day they put it up." A 2003 Newsday article called it "a neighborhood icon". A 2005 Times vignette found a similar division within a single optical shop on 46th Street, where an optician dismissed the arch as an "ugly thing" and said the renovation money would be better spent on policing, while her husband called it "a landmark" and noted that residents arrange to "meet under the arch". A 2007 Times feature described "old-timers" meeting beneath the arch to chat.

Officials and others have treated the arch as a defining neighborhood symbol. On the completion of the 2009 restoration, Borough President Marshall said it had "served as a symbol of Sunnyside and become probably the best known location in the entire community". A 2015 City Council measure co-naming the 46th Street block called it "Sunnyside's iconic symbol", and Representative Joseph Crowley, in a Congressional Record tribute to Adams, called it "Sunnyside's most iconic symbol". Local business leaders have promoted it as a "gateway to Queens", and a 2020 New York City commercial-district assessment called the arch, alongside the elevated 7 train viaduct, one of the "icons of the neighborhood".
