= Michael Sorkin =

American architect (1948–2020)

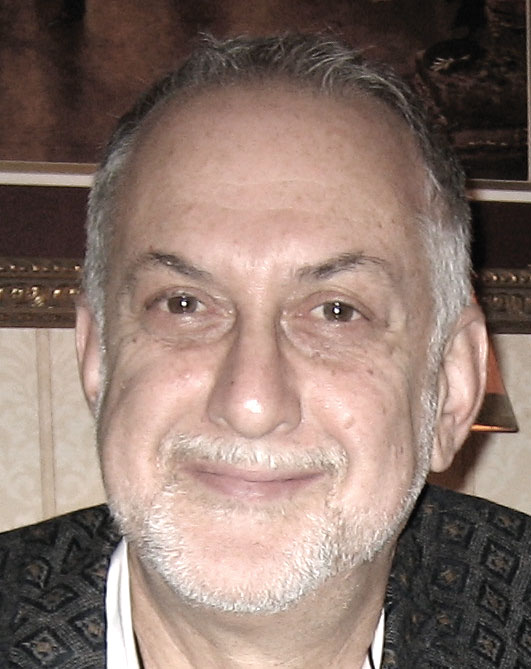
- Born: Michael David Sorkin; August 2, 1948; Washington, D.C., U.S.
- Died: March 26, 2020 (aged 71); Manhattan, New York City, U.S.
- Occupations: Architect, urban designer, writer, educator
- Spouse: Joan Copjec (m. 1982)
- Practice: Michael Sorkin Studio

Michael David Sorkin (August 2, 1948 – March 26, 2020) was an American architectural and urban critic, designer, and educator. He was considered to be "one of architecture's most outspoken public intellectuals", a polemical voice in contemporary culture and the design of urban places at the turn of the twenty-first century. Sorkin first rose to prominence as an architectural critic for the Village Voice in New York City, a post which he held for a decade throughout the 1980s. In the ensuing years, he taught at prominent universities around the world, practiced through his eponymous firm, established a nonprofit book press, and directed the urban design program at the City College of New York. He died at age 71 from COVID-19 complications.

== Early life and education ==
Sorkin was born in Washington, D.C., in 1948. He was an architect and urbanist whose practice spanned design, planning, criticism, and teaching. Sorkin received a bachelor's degree from the University of Chicago in 1969, and a masters in architecture from the Massachusetts Institute of Technology (M.Arch '74). Sorkin also held a master's degree in English from Columbia University (MA '70). He was founding principal of the Michael Sorkin Studio, a New York-based global design practice with special interests in urban planning, urban design and green urbanism.

== Career ==
=== Early career ===
Sorkin was house architecture critic for The Village Voice in the 1980s, and he authored numerous articles and books on the subjects of contemporary architecture, design, cities, and the role of democracy in architecture.

=== Academia ===
Sorkin was an educator at the collegiate level. He held positions of professor of urbanism and director of Institute of Urbanism of the Academy of Fine Arts, Vienna from 1993 to 2000, He was a visiting professor to many schools, including, for ten years, the Cooper Union in New York. Sorkin also held the Hyde Chair at the University of Nebraska–Lincoln College of Architecture, the Davenport Chair at Yale University School of Architecture, and the Taubman College of Architecture and Urban Planning, Eliel Saarinen Visiting Professorship, University of Michigan. He was a guest lecturer and critic at the Architectural Association School of Architecture in London, Harvard Graduate School of Design, Cornell University College of Architecture, Art, and Planning, University of Illinois: Urbana Champaign, Aarhus School of Architecture, Copenhagen, Denmark, and the London Consortium. He also taught at a number of institutions, including Columbia University, London's Architectural Association, and Harvard University.

Dedicated to architectural education for social change, Sorkin oversaw fieldwork in distressed environments such as Johannesburg, South Africa and Havana, Cuba. He co-organized "Project New Orleans" with collaborators Carol McMichael Reese and Anthony Fontenot, to support the post-Katrina city. In 2008, Sorkin was appointed Distinguished Professor of Architecture of the City University of New York.

=== Design practice ===
He was a principal in the Michael Sorkin Studio. The studio in New York City focuses primarily on professional practice in the urban public realm. Sorkin designed environmental projects in Hamburg, Germany, and proposed master plans for the Palestinian capital in East Jerusalem, and the Brooklyn waterfront and Queens Plaza in New York City. His urban studies have been the subject of gallery exhibits, and in 2010, he received the American Academy of Arts and Letters award in architecture. Sorkin presented regularly at regional, national, and international conferences, and he served as adviser and juror on numerous professional committees, including The Guggenheim Helsinki Design Competition, The Aga Khan Trust for Culture's Aga Khan Award for Architecture, Chrysler Design Award, the New York City Chapter of the American Institute of Architecture, Architectural League of New York, and in the area of design writing and commentary, for Core 77.

Sorkin was the co-president of the Institute for Urban Design, an education and advocacy organization, and vice president of the Urban Design Forum in New York.

==== Urban planning projects (selection) ====
- 1994: Masterplan for the Brooklyn Waterfront.
- 1994: Proposal for Südraum Leipzig
- 1998: Alternative University of Chicago campus masterplan.
- 2001: Proposal for Arverne Urban Renewal Area on the Rockaway peninsula, Queens, N.Y.
- 2001: A Plan For Lower Manhattan.
- 2004: Project for Penang Peaks, Penang, Malaysia.
- 2005: Masterplan for New City, Chungcheong, South Korea.
- 2009: Seven Star Hotel, Tianjin Highrise Building, Tianjin, China.
- 2010: Case Study: Feeding New York in New York. 3rd International Holcim Forum 2010 in Mexico City.
- 2010: Plan for Lower Manhattan. Exhibition, Our Cities Ourselves: The Future of Transportation in Urban Life Center for Architecture, Greenwich Village, N.Y.
- 2012: concept for Xi'an, China Airport Office Building
- 2013: 28+: MOMA PS1 Rockaway.
- 2013: New York City Football Stadium Site Survey.
- 2013: An alternative proposal for NYU.

=== Writing and publishing ===
Sorkin had a broad career as an architecture writer. He wrote on the topics of contemporary architecture and urban dynamics, along the dimensions of environmentalism, sustainability, pedestrianization, public space, urban culture, and the legacy of modernist approaches to urban planning. He was a member of the International Committee of Architectural Critics. For ten years, Sorkin was architecture critic for The Village Voice, and he wrote for Architectural Record, The Architectural Review, Metropolis, Vanity Fair, Vogue, and The Nation. As a volume editor, he organized multi-authored publications, and he contributed essays to a range of architecture publications. He also authored 20 books.

== Legacy ==
=== Death ===
Sorkin died on March 26, 2020, from complications brought on by COVID-19 in Manhattan. His death was among the design profession's most prominent losses during the beginning of the COVID-19 pandemic — making news internationally and met with an outpouring of tributes and obituaries in mainstream, leftist, and architectural media.

=== Awards and recognitions ===
- 2009, 2010: Fellow of the American Academy of Arts & Sciences
- 2010: Graham Foundation Architecture Award
- 2011 Graham Foundation, for New York City (Steady) State with Robin Balles and Christian Eusebio.
- 2013: Cooper Hewitt, Smithsonian Design Museum Design Mind Award.
- 2015: John Simon Guggenheim Memorial Foundation Fellow in Architecture, Planning and Design

== Bibliography ==
=== Books ===
- Exquisite Corpse: Writing on Buildings (1991)
- Variations on a Theme Park: The New American City and the End of Public Space (1992)
- Local Code: The Constitution of a City at 42° N Latitude (1993)
- Some Assembly Required (2001)
- Twenty Minutes in Manhattan (2009)
- All Over the Map: Writing on Buildings and Cities (2011)
- What Goes Up: The Right and Wrongs to the City (2018)
