= Bankhaus Bondi & Maron =

Defunct private bank in Germany

Bankhaus Bondi & Maron was a defunct private bank based in Dresden.

Founded in 1755 by Simon Isaac Bondi (1711–1773), who came from Prague and was appointed court factor in Dresden, the bank initially focused on the bill of exchange business and transactions for the House of Wettin. Starting in the 1830s, it shifted its focus to financing the wool trade and the textile industry.

In 1870, Joseph Bondi's (1818–1897) sister Cecilie, a granddaughter of the founder, married the Hanau banker Ignatz Maron (1842–1922), who then joined the bank as a partner and helped it to acquire the double name that it kept to this day. The bank flourished during the founding period, when the bank, managed by Joseph Bondi (1818–1897) and Maron, acquired a majority shareholding in the renowned Waldschlößchen brewery, among other things.

After Bondi's death, his son Felix Bondi took a role in managing the bank. Ignatz Maron's son Ernst married Isle Arnhold, of the Arnhold banking family.

When the Nazis came to power in Germany in 1933, the Jewish heritage of the bank's owners made their families and the bank a target for Nazi persecution. In 1937, the bank was taken over by Deutsche Bank as part of the "Aryanization" process of transferring business to non-Jews under the Nazis' antisemitic racial laws.

== Literature ==
- Simone Lässig: Jüdische Privatbanken in Dresden. In: Dresdner Hefte. Nr. 61, ISBN 3-910055-53-2, p. 86.
