= Van Alen Institute =

Nonprofit architectural organization

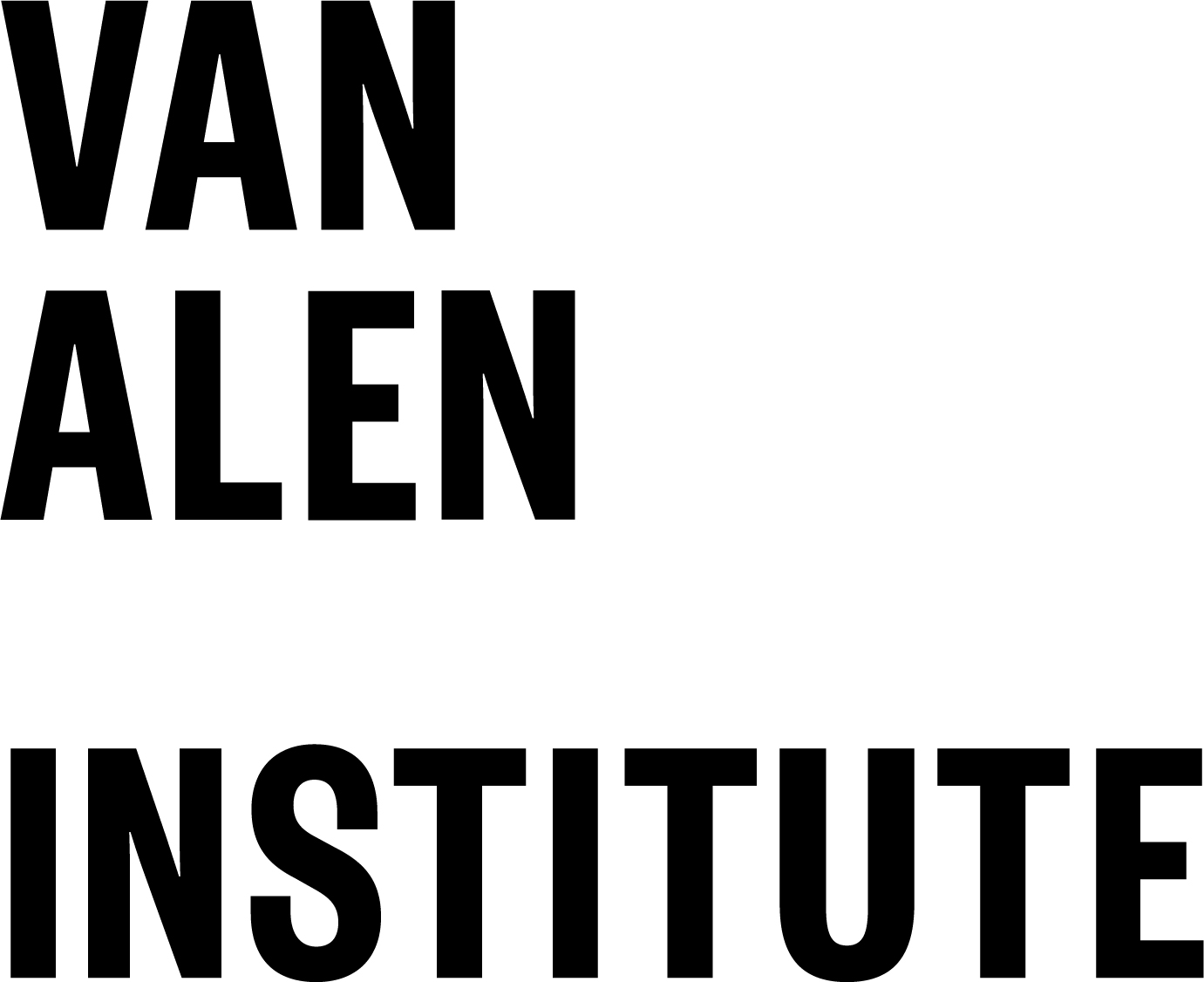
- Predecessor: Society for Beaux-Arts Architects; Beaux-Arts Institute of Design; National Institute for Architectural Education
- Formation: 1894
- Type: 501(c)3
- Headquarters: Brooklyn, New York

Van Alen Institute is a Brooklyn-based independent nonprofit architectural organization that works to create equitable cities through inclusive design. It is located at 303 Bond St in Gowanus, Brooklyn.

== History ==
Van Alen Institute was founded in 1894 as the Society of Beaux-Arts Architects, later the Beaux-Arts Institute of Design and National Institute for Architectural Education. In 1995, the institute was named in honor of William Van Alen, architect of the Chrysler Building and recipient of the institute's 1908-1909 Paris Prize.

Van Alen Institute's current executive director is Hayley Eber, who previously served as acting dean of the Cooper Union’s Irwin S. Chanin School of Architecture. The prior executive director was Deborah Marton, who also serves as President of the New York City Public Design Commission.

== Work ==
Van Alen Institute has supported architects, urban thinkers, designers, and scholars through design competitions, fellowships, awards, and public programs. It has fostered dialogue about architecture as a creative practice.

Van Alen Institute initiatives include Parks for the People and Ground/Work: A Design Competition for Van Alen Institute's New Street-Level Space. The institute was also a partner in Rebuild by Design and Changing Course: Navigating the Future of the Lower Mississippi River Delta.

In 2020, Van Alen Institute collaborated with the Urban Design Forum on Neighborhoods Now, a COVID-19 pandemic response initiative that paired businesses in hard-hit neighborhoods with pro-bono design support. Outcomes included outdoor restaurant seating, a night market in Manhattan's Chinatown, and safety protocol posters.

== See also ==
- Beaux-Arts Institute of Design
