= Klemens von Klemperer =

Historian of modern Europe

Klemens Wilhelm von Klemperer
- Born: November 2, 1916
- Died: December 23, 2012 (aged 96)
- Scientific career
- Doctoral advisor: William L. Langer

Klemens Wilhelm von Klemperer (November 2, 1916 – December 23, 2012) was a historian of modern Europe and professor at Smith College, Northampton, Massachusetts. He was a prominent member of the generation of young refugees and emigrants who fled Nazi Germany in the 1930s and established themselves as historians and often leading scholars in the United States. His teaching and writings focused on 20th century Germany and Central Europe, in particular the Nazi regime and the resistance to Hitler. In 1997, he was awarded the Austrian Cross of Honour for Science and Art, 1st class for his contribution and services to Austrian culture. He delivered a lecture in June 1998 at Westminster Abbey to mark the unveiling of a sculpture of Dietrich Bonhoeffer in the "Martyrs' Gallery".

== Biography ==
=== Family background ===
Klemens von Klemperer had a privileged childhood. He was born in Berlin, one of four children of Herbert and Frieda (née Kuffner) von Klemperer. His father was the president of Berliner Maschinenbau-AG (BMAG), a company that supplied locomotives as well as submarines and torpedoes to the military establishment. He was a grandson of Gustav Klemperer von Klemenau, a prominent banker who rose to become the chairman of the Dresdner Bank, the nephew of banker Victor Klemperer von Klemenau, and great nephew of Moriz von Kuffner, Viennese brewer and pioneering alpinist. The family had had a secular Jewish background until his grandfather converted to Protestantism.

=== Education ===
He finished his schooling at the Französisches Gymnasium Berlin in 1934. His father used his influence and contacts to get him a place at Balliol College, Oxford, but Klemens had other ideas. After only two weeks there, he "ran away" as he says in his memoir published in 2009. He made his way to Vienna, thinking his presence there would be more fruitful, given the upheaval in the country, especially as his grandmother and maternal aunts there were going through difficult times.

He enrolled at the University of Vienna, where he studied history of law under Heinrich Mitteis. After the Anschluss in March 1938, he emerged as one of the prominent anti-Nazi student leaders in Vienna. Von Klemperer befriended the brothers Otto Molden and Fritz Molden, future leaders of the O5 resistance movement, joining them in the Parthenen mountain hut gathering of July 1938. However, in November 1938, mounting political disturbances and his family's Jewish background forced him to flee to the United States. In the waning months of his life in Austria, he served as executor for the manuscripts in the estate of Hugo von Hofmannsthal, Austrian playwright, poet, and great uncle by marriage to the Kuffner branch of his Viennese family. In 1939, his parents emigrated to Britain.

After arriving in New York, von Klemperer joined Harvard University as one of 14 students accepted under Franklin D. Roosevelt's support initiative for refugee scholars. However, his studies were interrupted from 1942 to 1946 when he served as an intelligence officer in Eisenhower's G2 intelligence unit of SHAEF, He spent a year in London and was also stationed in Versailles and Berlin

=== Academic career ===
After the Second World War, he returned to Harvard and obtained his PhD in 1949. His doctoral advisor was William L. Langer; Klemperer later emphasized how much he also owed to the older generation of refugee scholars. He went on to teach at Smith College. Here, he also met Elizabeth Gallaher, whom he married and who later became a professor of literature at Smith College. He became L. Clark Seelye Professor of History in 1979. He retired officially in 1987 but continued his work in academia, teaching at Smith College, Amherst College and at the University of Massachusetts.

In 1973, he became a visiting fellow at Churchill College, Cambridge, England, where he lectured for a year. He was also a visiting fellow at Trinity College, Oxford for two years from 1980, and at the Institute for Advanced Study, Berlin in 1985-6. In addition, he became a Five College Professor in 1990. He also served on the board of the Volkswagen Foundation from 2000 to 2005, and of the Forschungsgemeinschaft 20. Juli 1944 from 2000-2012. He remained an active scholar well into his 90s, publishing a memoir in 2009. His last book, a historical interpretation of the work of German artist Käthe Kollwitz, was published in 2011, shortly before his death.

== Publications ==
von Klemperer published eight books and numerous historical articles. Much of his work is about the Nazi period in German history. His most acclaimed book appeared in 1992 viz. German Resistance against Hitler: The Search for Allies Abroad 1938–1945. Although the topic was not new, he shed new light on the subject and presented an in-depth study and balanced view of what actually transpired, based on his own painstaking research.

=== Selected works ===
- Germany's New Conservatism (Princeton, NJ, 1957).
- Ignaz Seipel: Christian Statesman in a Time of Crisis (Princeton, NJ, 1972).
- Kurt von Schuschnigg. Neue Österreichische Biographies, Vol 22 (Vienna, 1987).
- A Noble Combat: The Letters of Shiela Grant Duff and Adam von Trott zu Solz, 1932-1938 (Oxford, 1988).
- German Resistance Against Hitler: The Search for Allies Abroad 1938–1945 (Oxford, 1992).
- More on the German Resistance, Smith Alumnae Quarterly, Summer 1993.
- German Incertitudes: The Stones in the Cathedral (Westport, CT, 2002).
- Voyage Through the 20th Century: A Historian's Recollections and Reflections (New York/Oxford, 2009).[21]
- The Passion of a German Artist: Käthe Kollwitz (Xlibris, 2011).

== Sotheby's auction ==
Towards the end of his life, von Klemperer regained his Austrian citizenship, which had been effectively taken away from him during the Nazi years. However, he retained his US citizenship. In 2008, a significant work of art, which had been seized from his father Herbert von Klemperer in 1938, was returned to his family through a legal process of restitution. The painting, a portrait of a bagpiper by Hendrick ter Brugghen, one of the Utrecht Carravagisti, had been forcibly sold to the Wallraf-Richartz Museum in Köln where it hung for the next 70 years. In 2009, the restituted painting was sold by the von Klemperer family at Sotheby's for a record price, and now hangs in the National Gallery of Art in Washington DC.

== Personal ==
Klemens von Klemperer died, aged 96, on December 23, 2012 at his home in Easthampton, Massachusetts.

He had been married to Elizabeth (née Gallaher), who survived him, for 59 years. They had two children, a son James and a daughter Catharine.
