= Felix Bondi =

Felix Eliyahu Bondi (born 26 October 1860 in Dresden; died 17 January 1934 in Dresden) was a German lawyer, notary, banker and art collector.

== Life ==
Felix Bondi was a Dresden lawyer and councillor of justice as well as a partner in Bondi & Maron, a bank founded by his family. He was the son of the lawyer, banker and councillor of commerce Joseph Bondi (1818-1897) and his second wife Julie, née Gottschalk. Felix Bondi became a lawyer and notary in his home town of Dresden. After the death of his father in 1897, he became a partner in the Bondi & Maron banking house in Dresden.

Bondi was an honorary judge at the Franco-German Court of Arbitration in Paris. He was co-editor of Staub's Praxis der Finanzierung in 1929 and the 1932 supplement, and also wrote for several legal journals. He was also a member of several supervisory boards and was active in many areas of charitable work and as a patron of the arts.

== Art collection ==
Bondi belonged to the Sächsischer Kunstverein and the Dresdner Kunstgenossenschaft and was a co-founder of the Dresdner Museumsverein. He was also known as an art collector. His collection, which included works by Max Klinger, Emil Orlik, Ferdinand Schmutzer, Max Liebermann, Félicien Rops, Heinrich Vogeler, Otto Fischer, Karl Hofer, Gustav Klimt, Oskar Kokoschka, Camille Pissarro, Camille, Paul Signac, Alfred Sisley, Franz von Stuck, and Ander Leonard Zorn, was housed in the Villa Comeniusstrasse 33. Many works were lost in the Nazi era partly due to a bombing raid on 13/14 February 1945.

He last lived in Dresden-Weißer Hirsch, Niddastrasse 9.

His grave is located in the urn grove in Dresden-Tolkewitz, Wehlener Straße.

== Family ==
Bondi married in 1890 to Anna, née Engelmann, from Ölmütz. Their son Herbert Leopold (1891-1914) died of a gunshot wound in the First World War; their son Erich Hellmut (1903-1922) also died young. Their son Joseph Werner (1898-1977) was an engineer. Their daughter Lalla was married to Gert Caden. Their daughter Sofie married Karl Isaak in Vienna on 29 May 1923; Felix Bondi wrote the commemorative publication Ein fröhliches Buch, which was published by Nathan Kaufmann in Frankfurt am Main.

== Nazi era persecution ==
When the Nazis came to power in 1933, Bondi and his family were persecuted because of their Jewish heritage. The family bank was aryanized. The heirs of Felix Bondi have registered 55 search requests for lost art on the German Lost Art Foundation website.

== Literature ==
- Herrmann A. L. Degener: Degeners Wer ist’s?. X. Ausgabe, Berlin 1935, S. 162.
