= Simon Klemperer =

Geophysicist

Simon L. Klemperer
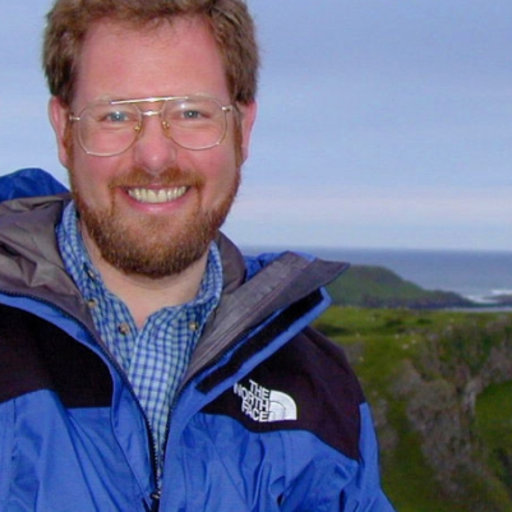
- Simon L. Klemperer
- Citizenship: U.S.
- Education: B.A./M.S 1984 University of Cambridge; Ph.D 1985 Cornell University
- Known for: Lithospheric structures and tectonics
- Awards: AGU, Fellow (2018) Geological Society of America, Fellow (1995) Geological Society of London, President's Award (1988)
- Scientific career
- Fields: Geophysics, Geology
- Workplaces: Stanford University
- Website: https://crustal.stanford.edu/research

Simon L. Klemperer is a geophysicist and professor of Geophysics and Geological Sciences at Stanford University. He is best known for his contribution in lithospheric structure and tectonics studies.

== Education ==
Klemperer completed his bachelor's (1980) and master's degree (1984) at Cambridge University. In 1985, he is conferred the Ph.D. degree from Cornell University for his thesis on 'the continental lower crust and Moho' studies.

== Research and career ==
Klemperer worked as a research fellow at Cambridge University after completing his Ph.D. degree. He joined the Stanford Geophysics faculty in 1990 and made the professor of Geophysics and Geological Sciences in 2005.

Klemperer's research mostly aims on understanding the lithospheric structures and tectonics using a variety of geophysics and geological methods, with particular focuses on Tibet Plateau and Himalaya. He has participated in the INDEPTH (International Deep Profiling of Tibet and the Himalaya) project, using seismic data to study the crustal movement beneath Tibet.

Klemperer is widely involved in collaborations with USGS, Indian NGRI, Chinese CAGS, and other university faculties in Tibet geophysical observations, including HIMPROBE and SINOPROBE. His research group also studies the earth's structures and tectonics with a global coverage.

== Awards ==
- 2018 AGU Fellow.
- 1995 Geological Society of America, Fellow.
- 1988 Geological Society of London, President's Award.

== Selected publications ==
- Caldwell, Warren B., Klemperer, Simon L., Lawrence, Jesse F., Rai, Shyam S., Ashish, (2013), Characterizing the Main Himalayan Thrust in the Garhwal Himalaya, India with receiver function CCP stacking, Earth and Planetary Science Letters, 367: 15–27.
- Karplus, M. S., Zhao, W., Klemperer, S. L., Wu, Z., Mechie, J., Shi, D., Brown, L. D., Chen, C., (2011), Injection of Tibetan crust beneath the south Qaidam Basin: Evidence from INDEPTH IV wide-angle seismic data, Journal of Geophysical Research: Solid Earth, 116 (B7).
- Leech, Mary L., Singh, S., Jain, A. K., Klemperer, Simon L., Manickavasagam, R. M., (2005), The onset of India–Asia continental collision: Early, steep subduction required by the timing of UHP metamorphism in the western Himalaya, Earth and Planetary Science Letters, 234 (1): 83–97.
