= James von Klemperer =

American architect (born 1957)

- Born: 1957 (age 68–69) (known year)
- Education: Harvard (BA); Princeton (MArch)
- Occupation: Architect
- Spouse: Alison von Klemperer
- Children: 2
- Practice: Kohn Pedersen Fox
- Buildings: One Vanderbilt, Lotte World Tower

James von Klemperer is a New York-based American architect. He is president of the architectural firm Kohn Pedersen Fox (KPF). He is known for his contributions to the designs of new cities, urban mixed-use clusters, and supertall buildings, including the Lotte World Tower, currently the world's fifth tallest building, and One Vanderbilt, adjacent to Grand Central Terminal and currently the tallest office building in Midtown Manhattan.

== Early life ==
von Klemperer was born in 1957 in Northampton, Massachusetts, to Klemens von Klemperer, a historian, and Elizabeth von Klemperer, a literary scholar. He attended Phillips Academy Andover and the Perse School in Cambridge, England. He received his Bachelor of Arts, magna cum laude, from Harvard University in 1979, majoring in history and literature. His thesis focused on the novels of Louis-Ferdinand Céline. Von Klemperer was awarded the Charles Henry Fiske Scholarship from Harvard, sending him to Trinity College at the University of Cambridge, where he began his architecture studies under Peter Carl. In 1983, he completed his master's in architecture, cum laude, from Princeton University, where he studied under Rafael Moneo, and was the recipient of the Butler Traveling Fellowship.

== Architectural career ==
In his 35-year career, von Klemperer has designed buildings in the United States, Europe, Asia, Africa, and the Middle East. He trained at KPF under the firm's founders, William Pedersen and A. Eugene Kohn, and senior Principal William Louie.

In the area of city planning, he led the design of New Songdo City in Korea, Meixi Lake in the Hunan province of China, and the Boston Seaport. Songdo is a 1,500 acre mixed-use community that received the first Sustainable City award from the Urban Land Institute in 2004.

One of the building types on which von Klemperer has focused, and for which KPF is best known, is the mixed-use, high rise urban cluster. Examples include Jing An Kerry Centre, which was recognized by ULI in 2015 with its Global Award for Excellence, and Plaza 66 in Shanghai, KPF's first major China project, which he undertook in partnership with Princeton classmate and fellow KPF Principal Paul Katz.

von Klemperer has designed several of the world's tallest buildings, including the 555-meter Lotte World Tower, working with KPF Principal Trent Tesch, and the 427-meter One Vanderbilt Tower. In contrast with such large projects, von Klemperer has designed smaller scale institutional and educational architecture. Examples include the Peterson Institute for International Economics in Washington, D.C. (completed 1999, AIA Award 2003), the Chadwick School in Incheon, Korea (completed 2008), the NYU Nursing and Dental building in New York (completed 2016), and the Peking University School of Transnational Law in Shenzhen (completed 2017).

== Academic and public service ==
In addition to his professional work, von Klemperer has taught at the Yale University School of Architecture as the Eero Saarinen Professor (2012, 2016). He has also lectured at many universities including Harvard, Columbia, École Speciale d'Architecture, Tsing Hua, Tongji, Seoul National University, and Tokyo University. He is a frequent lecturer at the Council on Tall Buildings and Urban Habitat, the NYAIA Center for Architecture, the Asia Society in New York and Hong Kong, and the Royal Institute of British Architects (RIBA) in London. Much of von Klemperer's academic work studies the potential for incorporating inclusive public space in urban settings.

He also serves on the boards of various educational and cultural institutions, including the Storefront for Art and Architecture and Bard College, and is the Chair of Boards for the Skyscraper Museum and the Urban Design Forum.

James von Klemperer was made a Fellow of the American Institute of Architects in 2006. He is also a member of the RIBA. In 2018, he was awarded the American Prize for Architecture, also known as the Louis H. Sullivan Award, from the Chicago Athenaeum.
