= Victor Klemperer von Klemenau =

German banker

Victor Klemperer von Klemenau (born June 20, 1876, in Dresden; died March 13, 1943, in Bulawayo, Southern Rhodesia) was a German banker persecuted by the Nazis because of his Jewish heritage.

== Life ==
Born in 1876, Klemperer's parents were the banker Gustav (1852–1926) and Charlotte Klemperer, née Engelmann (1857–1934). Brought up Jewish with his brothers Herbert (1878–1951) and Ralph-Leopold (1884–1956), he converted to the Protestant faith in 1907 when he married Sophie Reichenheim (1888–1976). From 1910, he was allowed to call himself Edler von Klemenau. With Sophie he had four children: Sophie Charlotte (1909–2004), Peter Ralph (1910–2000), Gustav Victor (1915–1997) and Elisabeth-Dorothea (1918–1977).

Klemperer studied law at the universities of Halle (Saale), Berlin and Freiburg im Breisgau and, in 1898, he completed his doctorate in Halle on the subject of "The legal nature of profit participation certificates". Klemperer completed his voluntary military service in 1899 in a field cannon regiment in Prague.

== Banking ==
Klemperer began training in Dresdner Bank in 1898. After working for the banking house Alfred Kessler & Co. in New York City from 1899, he joined Ludwig Loewe & Co. AG in Berlin in 1902. In January 1904, he returned to Dresdner Bank and joined the Berlin branch as an authorized signatory. In 1908, he moved to the Leipzig branch, which he played a key role in founding; in 1909, he took over management. In January 1914, he took over the management of the bank's Dresden head office, which was responsible for Saxony and had previously been managed by his father. He did military service from 1914 to 1918 in the First World War as captain for Austria, and was decorated with four medals. He held this position until May 31, 1934, and was thus responsible for all company decisions relating to the Saxon-Central German region.

He played a key role in the expansion of Dresdner Bank, which had the largest branch network in the Free State of Saxony. The TH Dresden awarded him the title of Honorary Senator in 1929.

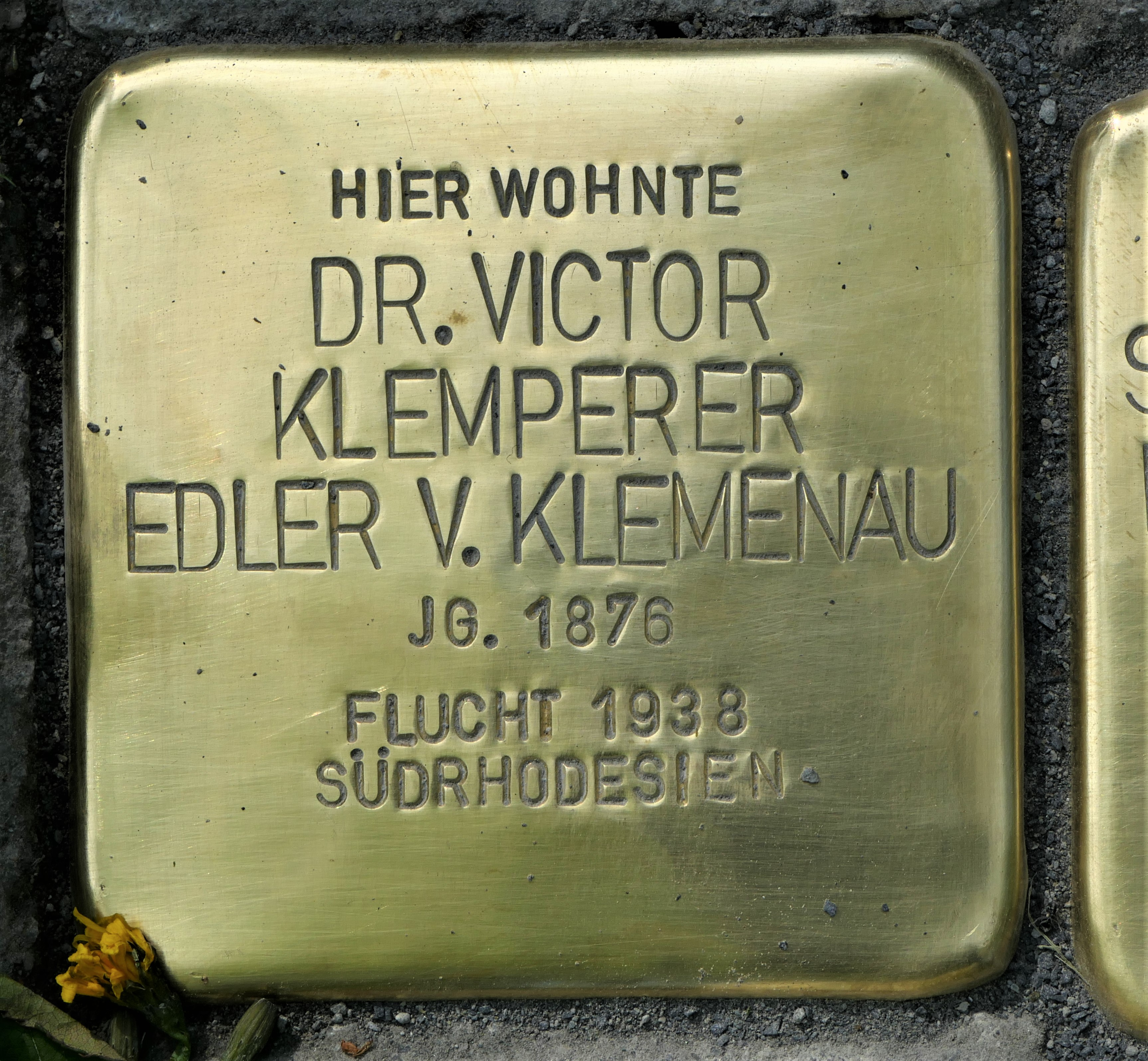

== Nazi era persecution ==
When the Nazis came to power in Germany in 1933, Klemperer was persecuted because of his Jewish heritage, even though he had converted. He was forceably retired in June 1934. When he was banned from holding positions on committees in June 1938, he fled Germany with his wife and was granted asylum in Southern Rhodesia, to which his brother Ralph had fled in May 1937. Victor Klemperer's wife Sophia traveled back to Germany in October 1938 to sell the former family villa. She returned to Bulawayo in November 1938.

== Art collection ==
Kleperer had an exquisite art collection, which consisted of porcelain, paintings, sculptures and books. The Nazis confiscated it in 1938, targeting it for Hitler's planned "Führer Museum" in Linz. Hitler personally ordered its transfer to the state of Saxony on November 17, 1942. Before the end of the war, 13 manuscripts, 549 incunabula and 510 bibliophile prints were transferred to the Saxon State Library. Only 12 incunabula were returned from the temporary storage facilities after May 1945. With the partial return of library holdings from the Soviet Union in 1958, the depository's holdings grew to 295 works, which were restituted to the heirs in 1991.

== Restitution claims ==
On June 17, 2011, a committee appointed by the Belgian city of Ghent rejected the Klemperer heirs' restitution claims for the return of a Portrait of Ludwig Adler by Oskar Kokoschka (1913). During a Kokoschka exhibition in Vienna between May and June 1937, it had been exhibited under the ownership of Victor Klemperer, who sold it to Herbert E. Kurz, Chemnitz, in 1938. After several changes of ownership, it was acquired by the Ghent Museum voor Schone Kunsten in 1987, where it has been on display ever since.

In 2012 the Jacksonville, Florida's Cummer Museum of Arts and Gardens voted to repatriate two works of porcelain it concluded had been stolen by the Nazis during WWII. The works had belonged to Klemperer's father, Gustav.

The German Lost Art Foundation lists more than one hundred artworks that Klemperer's heirs are searching for, and hundreds more for the family.

== Family ==
His nephew, son of his brother Herbert, was Klemens von Klemperer, a historian of modern Europe and professor at Smith College, Northampton, Massachusetts.

== Works ==
- Victor Klemperer: Die rechtliche Natur der Genussscheine. Dissertation, Halle-Wittenberg 1898
- Erich von Rath, Konrad Haebler: Frühdrucke aus der Bücherei Victor von Klemperer. Dresden 1927.

== Literature ==
- Andreas Graul: Gustav und Victor von Klemperer. Eine biographische Skizze (= Eugen-Gutmann-Gesellschaft e.V. [Hrsg.]: Publikationen der Eugen-Gutmann-Gesellschaft. Band 2). Leipziger Universitätsverlag, Leipzig 2005.
- Klemperer, Victor Edler von Klemenau, in: Joseph Walk (Hrsg.): Kurzbiographien zur Geschichte der Juden 1918–1945. Saur, München 1988, ISBN 3-598-10477-4, S. 197.
- Franz Lerner (1980). "Klemperer von Klemenau, Viktor". Neue Deutsche Biographie (in German). Vol. 12. Berlin: Duncker & Humblot. p. 36. (full text online).
