= Urban Design Forum =

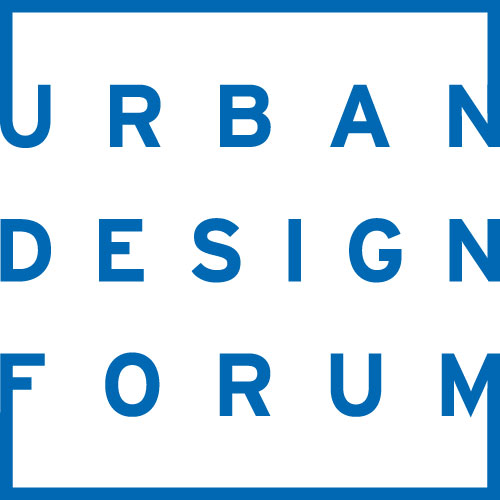
- Predecessor: Institute for Urban Design; Forum for Urban Design
- Formation: 2014
- Type: 501(c)3
- Tax ID no.: 11-3756463
- Headquarters: New York City, New York
- Board President: James von Klemperer
- Revenue: $181,094 (2015)

The Urban Design Forum is a not-for-profit New York organization devoted to urban design. It seeks to amplify the influence and understanding of urban design's role in creating dynamic, cooperative, competitive, and sustainable cities. The organization was formed from the merger of the Institute for Urban Design and the Forum for Urban Design in March 2014.

== History ==
=== Institute for Urban Design (1979–2014) ===
Between 1970 and 1979, Ann Ferebee, the founder of the Institute for Urban Design, was the editor of the magazine Urban Design, previously titled Design & Environment. This publication was an inter-professional magazine for architects, engineers, city planners, landscape architects and designers. In 1978 (October 18–21), Ferebee and Urban Design organized an international conference titled “Cities Can Be Designed” at the Citigroup Center (then called the Citicorp Center) in New York. The Institute for Urban Design was incorporated a few months earlier in August 1978. In November 1979, the Institute launched a bi-monthly magazine called Urban Design International, wherein advancements and innovations in urban design were shared. Famed graphic designer and inventor of the I ♡ NY design, Milton Glaser was the magazine's Design Consultant and creator of the Institute's logo.

The Institute for Urban Design was unique in both its scale and purpose in that it was the first national institution in America to focus solely on issues of urban design.

=== Forum for Urban Design (2005–2014) ===
In October 2005 the Forum for Urban Design held its inaugural event "New Orleans Rebuilds" just two months after Hurricane Katrina devastated the Gulf Coast.

In 2007, the "Cities Conference on Urban Design" brought together city planners from Boston, London, New York, Singapore, Toronto, and Vancouver to discuss public-realm design challenges in the city's financial core.

In 2008, the Forum organized a presentation on bike share projects in different world cities along with a free bike share pilot program that provided bicycles in Red Hook for use throughout New York City. The Forum, in partnership with the Storefront for Art and Architecture, then used the weekend of free bike use to study how bike sharing could work in New York City five years before Citi Bike officially launched.

=== Urban Design Forum (since 2014) ===
On March 13, 2014, the two organizations officially joined together to create the Urban Design Forum. Today, the Urban Design Forum continues the work of both organizations, hosting programs on modern urban issues and publishing the Urban Design Review.

In April 2014, the Urban Design Forum's inaugural program discussed public housing across the country with "The State of Public Housing" panel, the first in a series of events called The Housing Question focusing on affordable and equitable housing.

In the fall of 2015, the Urban Design Forum began a new series on transportation called Onward: New Ideas for Transportation. The series hopes to explore the future of transportation in New York with the advent of autonomous cars, ride-sharing, and rapid delivery systems.

== Membership ==
Members through the years have included professionals at the forefront of urban design thought. Today, fellows are nominated by peers and selected annually by the Board of Directors based on outstanding contributions in architecture, development, and urban planning.

The Urban Design Forum is headed by Executive Director Daniel McPhee, Chairman Daniel Rose and President James von Klemperer. The Board of Directors includes Alexander Garvin, Michael Sorkin, Timur Galen, Byron Stigge, Meredith J. Kane, James Corner, Patrice Derrington, Paul Goldberger, Tami Hausman, Beatrice Sibblies, Marilyn Jordan Taylor, Nader Therani, and Thomas Wright.

== Forums, Symposia, and Events ==
From its very beginning with the "Cities Can Be Designed" conference, the discussion and sharing of new ideas has been a central goal of the Urban Design Forum. Other notable events have included International Design Conferences held in Philadelphia, Boston, Galveston, Toronto, Washington, D.C., and Pittsburgh. World Cities Tours included Paris, Helsinki, Berlin, and Jerusalem with the Berlin conference and tour held in 1981 a full eight years before the fall of the Berlin Wall and reunification of East and West Germany.

In 2007, the Institute held an event and published a notebook both titled “New York 2030” in response to Mayor Bloomberg's PlaNYC. PlaNYC sought to turn New York into the world's most sustainable metropolis by 2030.

In 2012, Institute was invited to present the US Pavilion for the 13th Venice Architecture Biennale with an exhibit called “Spontaneous Interventions: Design Actions for the Common Good." The project presented innovative design solutions to urban problems with an interactive exhibit that allowed visitors to pull down brightly colored banners to display an issue and its solution. Banners were color-coded with accessibility issues in orange, community in pink, economy in light green, and sustainability in dark green.

In 2013, the Forum held a series of roundtable discussions that resulted in "Next New York", a collection of 40 innovative proposals for adapting New York City in the 21st century. Proposals included ideas for roads, bridges, housing, zoning, public space, and more. In particular, a proposal by Alexander Garvin to build a light rail line connecting Brooklyn and Queens has gained political traction. The proposed route is currently being evaluated in a feasibility study by HR&A.

== Similar Organizations ==
Similar organizations include The Architectural League of New York, The Van Alen Institute, The Municipal Art Society, Project for Public Spaces, The Center for Urban Pedagogy, and Openhousenewyork.
