= Gustav Klemperer von Klemenau =

German banker

Gustav Klemperer von Klemenau (born Gustav von Klemperer) (1852–1926), was a prominent German banker. He served as chairman of the Dresdner Bank following the retirement of Eugen Gutmann.

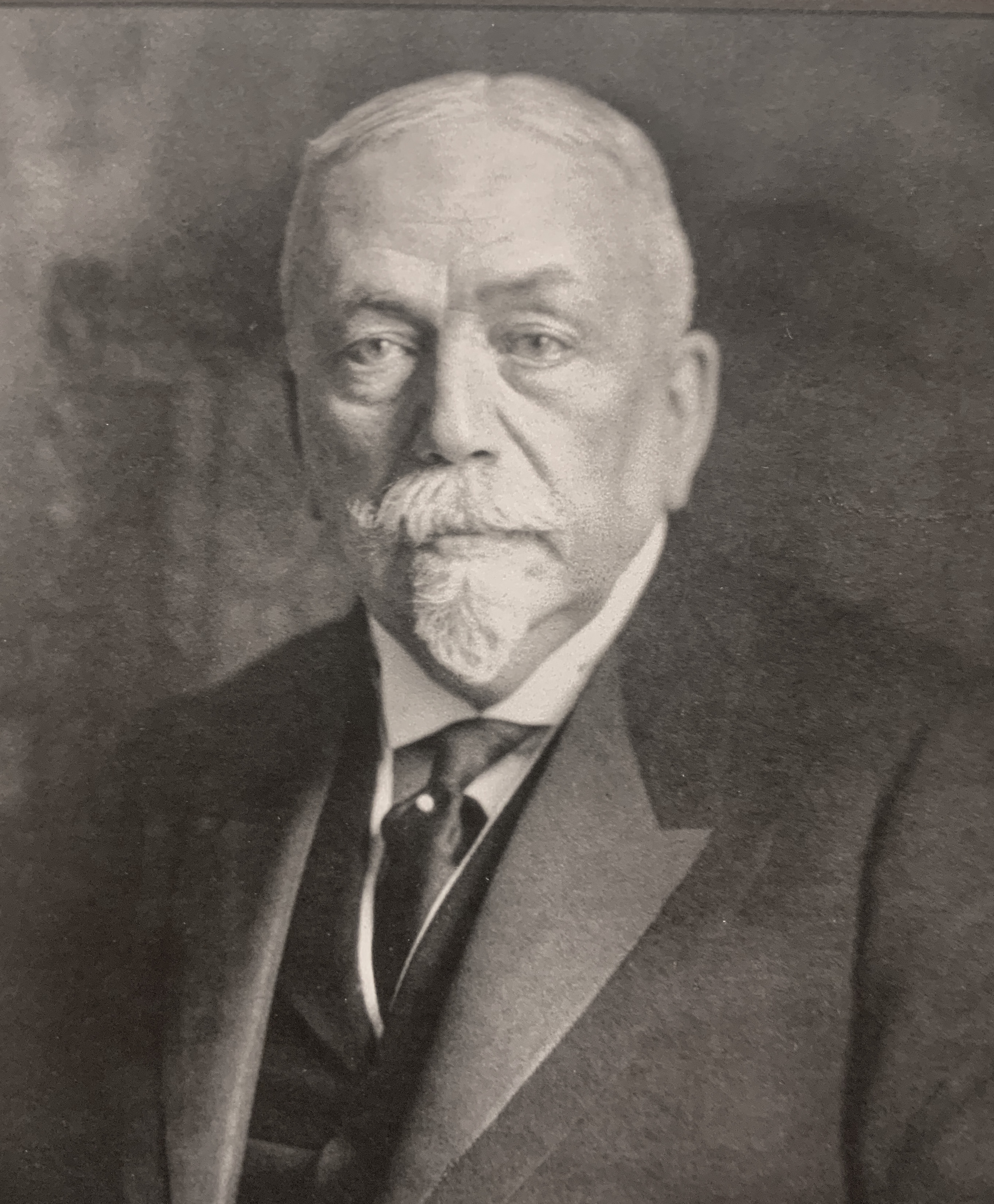
Photo of Gustav Klemperer von Klemenau

== Banker ==
Klemperer was born on April 24, 1852, in Prague to Adolph Klemperer and Henrietta Meyer Klemperer. In 1866, aged 14, he became an apprentice at the banking house of Julius Hirsch. In 1871, he joined the Bank Robert Thode & Co, which was acquired by Dresdner Bank in 1890. There, he became a member of the Board of Directors, and from 1890 to 1913 headed the Saxon branch of the bank. After serving as Deputy Chairman from 1914 to 1924, he became Chairman of the Board of Directors in 1925. He died in 1926.

== Public service ==
In addition to his banking positions, he was a noted public servant. From 1899, he served as the Austro-Hungarian honorary Vice Consul, and from 1905 the Vice Consul for Saxony. He also served as the honorary US consul in Dresden. In 1910, he was ennobled for his services to the empire by Emperor Franz Joseph I of Austria and given the hereditary title of Edler von Klemenau.

== Cultural interests ==
Klemperer's cultural interests included his active involvement in the Dresden University of Technology, yet it is perhaps the story of his extensive collection of Meissen porcelain, which was eventually confiscated by the Nazis and sent to Dresden's porcelain museum, that has received the most attention in this area of Klemperer's life. Considered by some to be the most impressive of its time it was removed and hidden in the hills east of the city in the early 1940s to avoid any damage from the WWII fighting that was raging at that time. When the approach of Soviet troops threatened the valuable collection, the treasures were removed and transported to the west of the city by truck. Orders were given for the trucks not to stop in Dresden en route, yet the exhausted driver of one truck disobeyed, and parked in Dresden the night of February 13, 1945. By morning the truck, along with its precious crates of cargo, was reduced to rubble, and this uncatalogued portion of the collection was thought to be irretrievably lost. In 1951 a workman found a piece of porcelain in the still uncleared courtyard while performing a routine excavation. Curators were called and more was unearthed, all of it found to be from von Klemperer's collection. These pieces were eventually restored to the degree possible and later displayed.

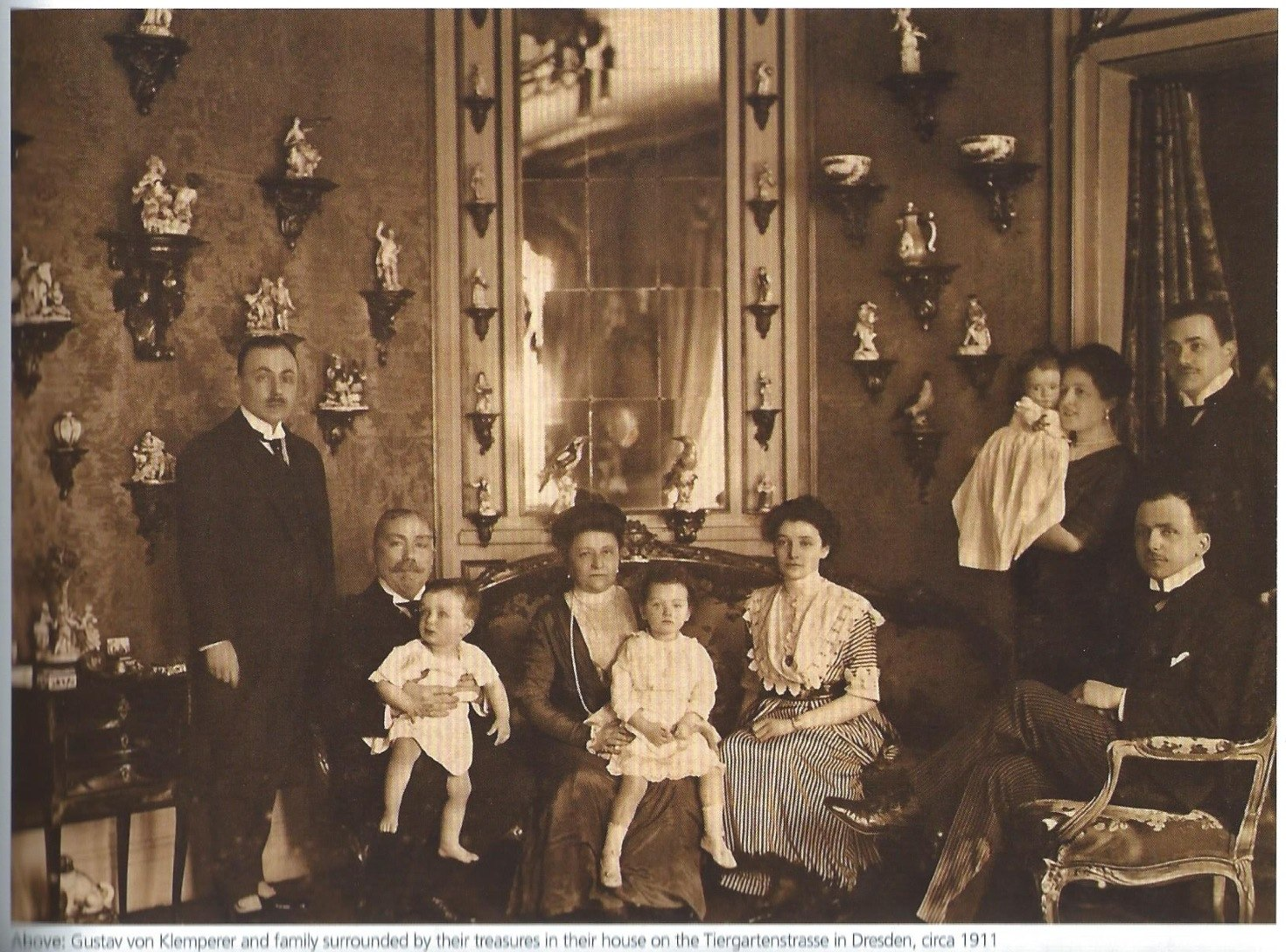
Gustav von Klemperer and family in Dresden with Meissen collection

== Heirlooms ==
In 1991, after German reunification, 83 pieces were returned to von Klemperer's descendants. Much of this was donated to the Zwinger museum in Dresden. In 2010, additional pieces were found in the Zwinger storerooms and once again donated to von Klemperer's descendants. Out of this second group of porcelain pieces, 43 lots were auctioned at a sale at Bonhams in London. A unique sale, many items sold for considerably more than their original estimates.

== Death ==
Klemperer died on December 27, 1926, in Dresden. He was married to Charlotte (Engelman). They had three sons, including Dr. Herbert von Klemperer'1878-1951) and Victor Klemperer von Klemenau (1876-1943). The historian Klemens von Klemperer was his grandson.
