= Ecumene =

Ancient Greek term for the habitable world - the Oecumene

In ancient Greece, the term oecumene (UK) or ecumene (US; from Ancient Greek οἰκουμένη (oikouménē) 'the inhabited world') denoted the known, inhabited, or habitable world. In Greek antiquity, it referred to the portions of the world known to Hellenic geographers, subdivided into three continents: Africa, Europe, and Asia. Under the Roman Empire, it came to refer to civilization itself, as well as the secular and religious imperial administration.

In present usage, it is most often used in the context of "ecumenical" and describes the Christian Church as a unified whole, or the unified modern world civilization. It is also used in cartography to describe a type of world map (mappa mundi) used in late antiquity and the Middle Ages.

== Etymology ==
A modern depiction of the ecumene described by Herodotus in the 5th century BC

The Greek term cited above is the feminine present middle participle of the verb οἰκέω (oikéō, '(I) inhabit') and is a clipped form of οἰκουμένη γῆ (oikouménē gē, 'inhabited world').

== Greece ==
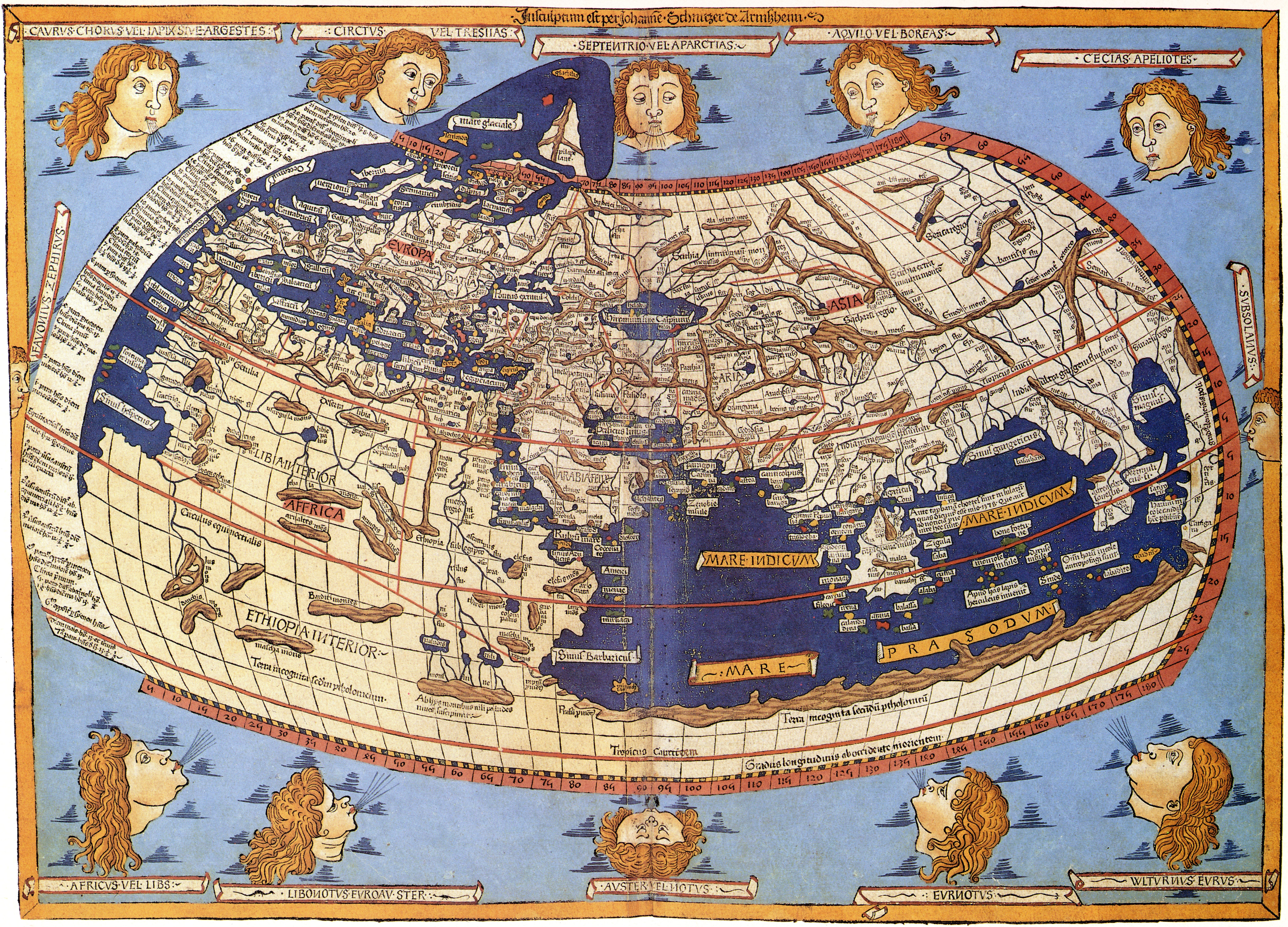
A Ptolemaic world map from the Geography (Johannes Schnitzer, 1482)

Ancient Greek and Roman geographers knew the approximate size of the globe, but remained ignorant of many parts of it. Eratosthenes of Cyrene (276–196 BC) deduced the circumference of the Earth with remarkable accuracy, within 10% of the correct value. The Greek cartographer Crates created a globe about 150 BC.

Claudius Ptolemy (83–161) calculated the Earth's surface in his Geography and described the inhabited portion as spanning 180 degrees of longitude, from the Fortunate Isles in the west to Serica (northern China) in the east and about 80 degrees of latitude, (Note: Although Ptolemy did not measure latitude with degrees but with hours of midsummer daylight, from 12 at the equator to 24 in the Arctic.) from Thule in the north to anti-Meroë and Macrobia below the equator. At its widest possible extent, the ancient ecumene thus stretched from northern Europe to equatorial Africa, and from the Atlantic Ocean to western China.

During the Middle Ages, this picture of the world was widened to accommodate Scandinavia, the North Atlantic, East Asia, and eventually sub-equatorial Africa. Ptolemy and other ancient geographers were well aware that they had a limited view of the ecumene, and that their knowledge extended to only a quarter of the globe.

These geographers acknowledged the existence of terrae incognitae, 'unknown lands', within Africa, Europe and Asia. A belief in global symmetry led many Greco-Roman geographers to posit other continents elsewhere on the globe, which existed in balance with the ecumene: Perioeci (lit. 'beside the ecumene'), Antoeci ('opposite the ecumene') and the Antipodes ('opposite the feet').

== Rome ==
The cameo Gemma Augustea includes a Roman artistic personification of Oikoumene as she crowns an emperor, probably Augustus, perhaps for bringing peace to the (Roman) world.

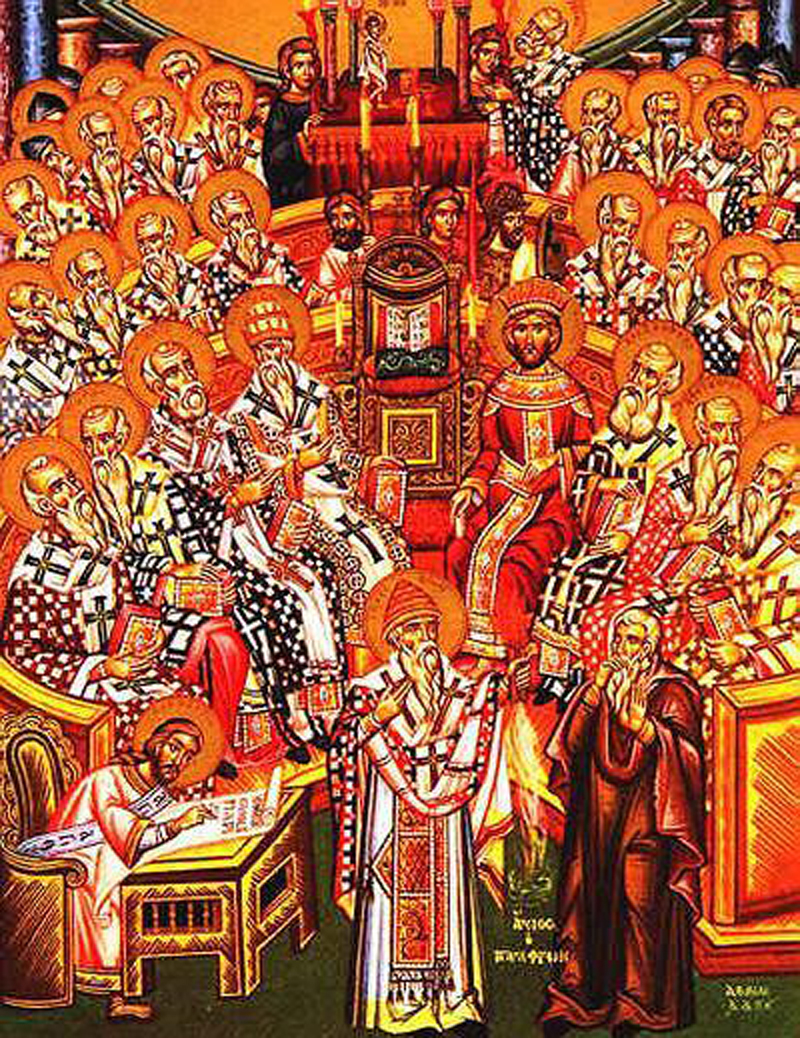
The First Council of Nicaea in 325

The word was adopted within Christianity after Constantine the Great's assembly of a synod of bishops from all over the world at the First Council of Nicaea in 325.

By that time, the Greek term had come to refer more specifically to the civilized world and then simply the Roman Empire. This usage continued after the Diocletian Reforms and the Byzantine emperors used it to refer to their imperial administration. Constantinople was the "Ecumenical City" and, after 586, the Patriarch of Constantinople was known as the "Ecumenical Patriarch of Constantinople".

Pope Gregory I objected to the adoption of this style by John IV of Constantinople, as it implied a universal jurisdiction he believed illegal to anyone but the bishop of Rome. His Fifth Epistle berates John for having "attempted to seize upon a new name, whereby the hearts of all your brethren might have come to take offence", despite the title having been granted at the emperor Maurice's behest.

The name continues to be borne by the Greek Orthodox patriarchs, although with the more restricted sense that they are the bishops of the former imperial capital.

== Modernity ==
=== Religion ===
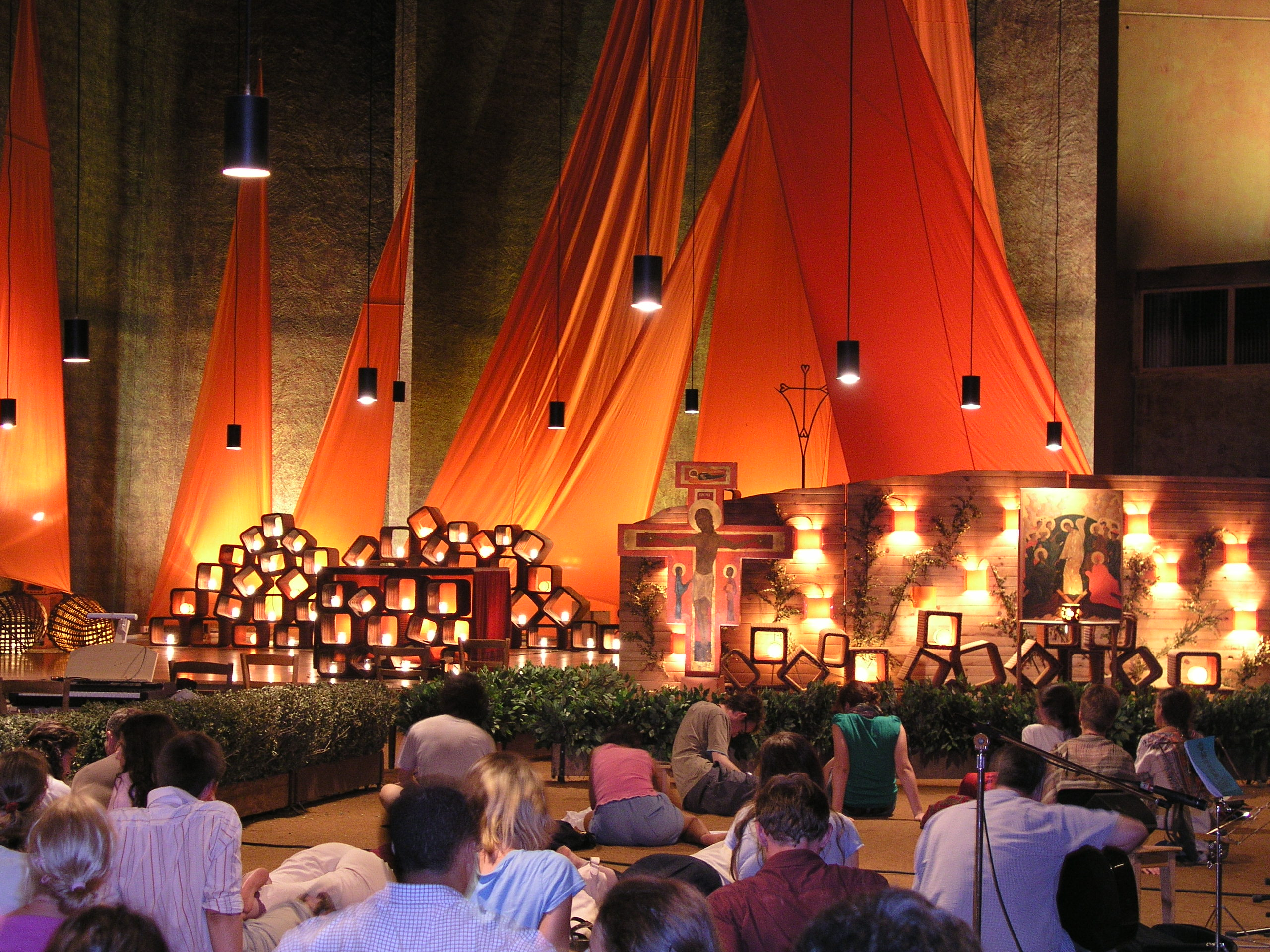
An ecumenical worship service at Taizé Community

Especially in the 20th century, the term has been employed to refer to unified Christian Church which is the ultimate goal of Ecumenism, a movement to promote cooperation among the various Christian denominations. The movement is not accepted by many Christian groups. The work of ecumenism takes place in the form of negotiations conducted between committees of various denominations and also through the deliberations of inter-denominational organizations such as the World Council of Churches who have registered as their web domain oikoumene.org. Relevant issues include Baptism, the Eucharist and Ministry.

=== Culture ===
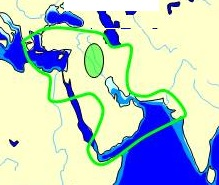
Known world of the Mesopotamian, Babylonian, and Assyrian cultures from documentary sources

In the context of cultural history, Lewis Mumford used the term "ecumene" in an academic sense in his work, Technics and Civilization (1934). William H. McNeill later popularized it in his Rise of the West (1963), suggesting that a single global ecumene emerged through the dominance of European political institutions, science, technology, and economic forms from the late 18th century onwards. One could argue that prior to the great voyages of discovery carried out by Christopher Columbus, Vasco da Gama, and Ferdinand Magellan, there were originally two separate ecumenes—one covering the Old World and one the New. The Spanish conquistadores fused these two ecumenes to form a single integrated "world system".

Peter Sloterdijk uses the terms "First Ecumene" and "Second Ecumene" in his book In the World Interior of Capital (2014, original German: Im Weltinnenraum des Kapitals, 2005). Sloterdijk takes these terms directly from the work of Eric Voegelin, specifically from Order and History vol. 4, The Ecumenic Age (1974), which he quotes.

Science fiction writer Ursula Le Guin derived the term Ekumen in her Hainish Cycle from this term.

The term "ecumene" can differ depending on the viewpoint from which it is perceived: for example, the Ancient Babylonians and the Ancient Greeks would each have known a different area of the world (though their worlds may have overlapped).

=== Cartography ===
The term is used in cartography and historical cartography to describe a type of map, namely the symbolic, schematic world maps made in late antiquity and the Middle Ages.
