= Correlli Barnett =

British military historian (1927–2022)

Correlli Barnett CBE FRHistS FRSL FRSA
- Born: 28 June 1927; Pollards Hill, Surrey, England
- Died: 10 July 2022 (aged 95); East Carleton, Norfolk, England
- Education: Trinity School of John Whitgift
- Alma mater: Exeter College, Oxford
- Occupation: Military historian
- Spouse: Ruth Murby (m. 1950–2020)
- Children: 2
- Military career
- Allegiance: United Kingdom
- Branch: British Army
- Service years: 1945-48
- Rank: Sergeant
- Unit: Intelligence Corps
- Conflicts: Palestine Emergency

Correlli Douglas Barnett (28 June 1927 – 10 July 2022) was an English military historian, who also wrote works of economic history, particularly on the United Kingdom's post-war deindustrialization.

== Early life ==
Barnett was born on 28 June 1927 in Pollards Hill, Surrey, the son of Douglas and Kathleen Barnett. He was educated at Trinity School of John Whitgift in Croydon and then Exeter College, Oxford where he gained a second class honours degree in Modern History with his special subject being Military History and the Theory of War, gaining an MA in 1954.

Barnett later said:

I can safely say there were only two books that I read at Oxford which strongly influenced my subsequent approach – one part of the Special Subject, and the other something which a friend recommended to me. The first was Clausewitz's On War, which was part of a Special Subject on military history and the theory of war. The other was Lewis Mumford's Technics and Civilization – if I read it again now I do not know what I would think of it, but certainly that was a starting point for my interest in looking at history in technological terms rather than in the constitutional/political terms prevalent at Oxford.

From 1945 to 1948, he served in the British Army in Palestine during the Palestine Emergency as a sergeant in the Intelligence Corps.

== Work ==
=== Military history ===
Barnett worked as historical consultant and writer for the BBC television series The Great War (1963–64). He contributed numerous articles to various newspapers arguing against the 2003 Iraq War.

He was the author of The Desert Generals, a book that attacked the perceived cult of British Field Marshal Bernard Montgomery and assessed the roles of his sacked predecessors as commanders in the North Africa campaign, including Richard O'Connor, who drove the Italians from Cyrenaica in late 1940, and Field-Marshal Sir Claude Auchinleck (whom he called "The Victor of Alamein"), who forced Rommel to a halt at the First Battle of El Alamein, only to be dismissed by Winston Churchill for his pains. Barnett pointed out that Montgomery enjoyed massive superiority of men and materiel at the Second Battle of El Alamein, and described him as an "emotional cripple", a description, he noted in subsequent editions, borne out "in rich detail" by the Nigel Hamilton biography. However, Barnett's conclusions were attacked by Field Marshal Michael Carver in his book Dilemmas of the Desert War; Carver calls Barnett "naïve" and notes numerous flaws in his work.

He also published Britain and Her Army 1509–1970, which as a survey combines the political, the social and the military over the grand sweep of Britain's post-medieval history.

In several of his works (The Desert Generals, The Swordbearers) Barnett portrayed the British armed forces as hidebound by tradition (e.g. cavalry regiments allegedly reluctant to adopt modern tank tactics) and by technology inferior to that of the Germans. This position was also attacked by Carver, who observed that during Operation Crusader and during the Battle of Gazala, British technology was a match for, or in some cases, better than that used by the German and Italian armies. Barnett made this point of the British armour in the desert, and of Jellicoe's Grand Fleet at Jutland in 1916.

In his Bonaparte (1978), he took a more critical view of Emperor of the French Napoleon Bonaparte than is customary, portraying him almost as a Mediterranean bandit keen to dish out crowns and honours to cronies and members of his blood family, and stressing how much many of his most famous successes owed much to bluff and luck (e.g. the fortuitous arrival of General Louis Desaix at the Battle of Marengo in 1800). His work, however, is widely dismissed by professional historians, who do not seriously consider his interpretations.

=== The Pride and Fall Sequence ===
Barnett's The Pride and Fall sequence comprises: (1) The Collapse of British Power; (2) The Audit of War: The Illusion and Reality of Britain as a Great Nation (published as The Pride and the Fall: The Dream and Illusion of Britain as a Great Nation, in the USA); (3) The Lost Victory: British Dreams, British Realities, 1945-50; and (4) The Verdict of Peace: Britain Between Her Yesterday and the Future.

In sum, the sequence describes the decline of British power during the twentieth century, a decline attributed by the author to a change in the values of Britain's governing élite from the late eighteenth century, and one which was encouraged by evangelical and non-conformist Christianity. Barnett claims that the statesmen of the eighteenth century were men "hard of mind and hard of will" who regarded "national power as the essential foundation of national independence; commercial wealth as a means to power; and war as among the means to all three". Furthermore, they regarded it as "natural and inevitable that nations should be engaged in a ceaseless struggle for survival, prosperity and predominance". The British national character, Barnett argues, underwent a profound moral revolution in the nineteenth century which came to have a deep effect on British foreign policy; foreign policy was now to be conducted in a reverence of highly ethical standards rather than an "expedient and opportunist pursuit of England's interests". Barnett came to this conclusion by beginning "with a colour-coded flow-chart which logically traced back step by step to their origins the chains of causation of all the 'total-strategic' factors in Britain's plight in 1940–1941: political, military, economic, technological. These various chains eventually converged on a common primary cause: a mutation in the values – indeed the very character – of the British governing classes which began in the early nineteenth century. This mutation supplied the starting-point of my narrative, and thereafter, in Enoch Powell's words in his review, was my 'guiding and interpretative thread through the events of the twenty inter-war years'."

A.J.P. Taylor said of The Collapse of British Power: "This is fine fighting stuff, powerfully based on the historical records". Robert Blake said the book was "Pungently written, perceptive and controversial". Rab Butler said that

The book should be praised for its profound research...It is written in excellent prose and with great historical ability which will be valuable to historians and challenging to any of us. However, to read alone it gives a false conception of Britain as we know her today, and is the sort of work which must be read in the company of others if one is to get a clear conception of the change of British status...I have some sympathy with the author's criticism of the defects of the English education system in those vital days, not only in the arts but also in the technical field...What is important, however, to realize in reading Mr Barnett's book is that the greatness of the Victorian age was made up of very much those qualities which he describes as leading to Britain's decline

Peter Hennessy claims The Audit of War "acquired an instant vogue when published in 1986". Paul Addison called The Audit of War as "the most thorough and sustained assault so far" on wartime orthodoxy. Addison recognised that Barnett "is a withering critic of nineteenth-century laissez-faire capitalism and its legacy for twentieth-century Britain. To this extent he shares some common ground with Marxist historians and quotes E.P. Thompson with approval. But he is no Marxist himself, and his ideal model of the relationship between state and society is Bismarckian. The development of modern Germany, through the creation of a state dedicated to the pursuit of national efficiency in a ruthlessly Darwinian world, is held up by Barnett as the example which Britain could, and should, have followed. Britain's tradition of collectivism he interprets as a decadent, "romanticizing humanism, anti-industrial, riddled with illusions, and perpetuated by the public-school system"". Addison criticised Barnett's thesis in The Audit of War as resting "on a number of simplifications. First, he divorced the history of Britain from its European context and thereby distorts the perspective. Secondly, he fails to acknowledge the political imperatives behind the reconstruction programme. Thirdly, he neglects the politics of industrial conservatism. Fourthly, his analysis is remarkably selective, singling out one factor – the welfare state – and one government, as uniquely responsible for difficulties that no other government, before or since, has surmounted".

Roger Scruton claimed that whilst Barnett's thesis against public schools was set forth in "a series of brilliant books", his view of education is mistaken: "Relevance in education is a chimerical objective and the English knew this. Who is to guess what will be relevant to a student's interests in ten years' time? Even in the applied sciences, it is not relevance that forms and transforms the curriculum, but knowledge". Scruton goes on to say: "And for what life of the mind would Correlli Barnett have us prepared? Certainly not one that offers what has been offered to him: namely a synoptic vision of a national identity. If we examine the complaints made by Barnett, we cannot fail to be struck by the fact that they contain no comparative judgement. Set beside which élite did the English fail so badly? In which country of the modern world do we find the educational system which compares so favourably with the English college? Which European nations, unhampered by the code of the gentleman, have shown us the way to successful empire building and retreated with credit from their colonies? All such comparisons point to the amazing success of the English. By devoting their formative years to useless things, they made themselves supremely useful. And by internalising the code of honour they did not, as Barnett supposes, make themselves defenceless in a world of chicanery and crime, but endowed themselves with the only real defence that human life can offer – the instinctive trust between strangers, which enables them in whatever dangerous circumstances to act together as a team".

== Politics ==
During the February 1974 general election Barnett wrote a letter to The Times:

It depresses me to the point of desperation that debate in this General Election only touches the fringes of the fundamental question before this country. This question is, of course, our chronic unsuccess as a competitive industrial power; our continual relative decline...This election...ought to be about the fundamental reshaping of the structure and attitudes of British industry (including our anarchic trade union organization; by legislation if necessary). Yet the Conservative Party only skirts the question, while the Labour Party ignores it totally...Who would believe, listening to the election argument, that this country stood on the verge of final eclipse as a leading power and industrial nation?

In 1974, Barnett wrote of Britain's economic crisis as a low-wage, low-investment and low-productivity nation:

the peculiar structure, history and attitudes of British trades unionism is—and has been for a century—largely, although not wholly, responsible for this dismal cycle. You cannot pay high wages unless you have already achieved high productivity. You cannot achieve high productivity unless the work-force is prepared to operate modern machines to the utmost of the machines' capacity. Yet for all the glib talk by trades union leaders about improving productivity, everyone knows that British industry is fettered by demarcations and other restrictive practices aimed at preserving somebody's "property rights" in a particular task...the necessary switch to a high-wage economy cannot be achieved in isolation, by the process of "free collective bargaining" (ie, extortion of money by menaces or force), but only in step with a parallel switch to high productivity and investment. Are Mr Scanlon's members—and other British workers—prepared to match the efficiency, flexibility, cooperativeness and zeal of German workers—or do they really simply want more money for going on as they are?

After the historian's E.P. Thompson planned Dimbleby Lecture on the Cold War was cancelled in 1981, Barnett asked whether he (Thompson) saw

any connexion between the internal nature of the Soviet empire as an oligarchic tyranny and its external policies? As a former communist he must know that the Soviet regime is of its very nature and from earliest origins a minority conspiracy that has gained and maintained power by force and trickery; that because of this inherent nature it always has been and remains terrified of independent centres of thought or power, whether within the Russian empire or beyond its present reach. It is the conjunction of such a regime, and its manifested wish to dominate others, with armed forces powerful beyond the needs of mere defence that is the engine of the present "armaments race". Who believes that Nato and its armaments would exist if Russia had been a Western-style open society these last 60 years? The first requirement for large-scale nuclear or any other kind of disarmament is the withering away of the Communist Party of the Soviet Union.

In 1982, Barnett said of Britain's Trident missile system that:

The American decision to sell us Trident only makes sense on the supposition that Washington absolutely trusts Britain to be a docile ally which would not step out of line...The question therefore arises of how closely Great Britain wishes to align herself with the United States over the next 40 years; of what unstated quid pro quos by way of support for American policy outside Europe may be involved. In a word, is Trident a reassertion of the "special relationship"? If that is the case, how well does such a relationship with the United States marry with the United Kingdom's membership of the EEC, and with her European policy in general? Are we not in danger of falling into mid-Atlantic between Europe and America? And should we not, at this period in our history, be aligning ourselves clearly with Europe in evolving a distinct European world policy, rather than leaning towards Washington.

After Britain's victory in the Falklands War Barnett spoke of the "courage, professionalism and ultimate success of our Falklands task force" but added:

The lesson of the Falklands crises is not that we need a blue-water surface fleet in case of similar residual bits of pink on the map come under attack, but that we should bring our foreign policy into congruence with our defence policy and shed such unprofitable bits of pink in good time. The real guilty men of the crisis are the MPs of both parties who, in the past, blocked possible deals with the Argentine with emotional cries of "sell-out" without apparently reckoning the possible cost of defending the Falklands against the value of the islands to the United Kingdom. Can it now be really argued that a capability to do another Falklands somewhere in the wide oceans is more important to our security of this country than the preservation of Western Europe, our own outer rampart and our greatest market?

Barnett said of the Franks Report which investigated the Falklands War: "...the British Establishment has sat in judgment on the British Establishment and found it not guilty...What is therefore needed is a critical examination of the Foreign Office as an institution: its collective 'house style' and outlook; the personalities and characters of its leading figures. Only then shall we understand how British policy evolves in terms of a specific situation like the Falklands".

In a 1996 interview, Barnett stated his belief that Britain's future lay with a form of federated Europe, including the adoption of the European single currency. He criticised Eurosceptics as "emotional idealists nostalgic for a lost past".

Barnett opposed British participation in the Kosovo War of 1999, arguing that Yugoslavia was "a sovereign state committing no aggression beyond its own borders, [the military action against it] is a breach of the UN Charter and likewise of the North Atlantic Treaty". Furthermore, on 30 March 1999 he claimed that the war's course had vindicated his original stance on "Nato's ill-thought-out policy, based on emotion and simplistic moralising...In particular, it has plunged the Kosovans, the objects of Nato's solicitude, into their present calamity". Later that year Barnett returned to the subject, saying that the 80-day-long air campaign against Serbian forces demonstrated "that air power is a clumsy means of political coercion" and "that Bosnia should have served as a warning to us not to get entangled over Kosovo, and that if we did get entangled, we would finish up to our necks in trouble – which we have".

In early August 2002, Barnett wrote to The Daily Telegraph opposing the American plan of invading Iraq, rejecting the claim that those opposed to the war were the equivalent of the appeasers of Adolf Hitler in the 1930s. He claimed that whereas Nazi Germany was disrupting the balance of power in Europe, Saddam Hussein's Iraq posed no threat to the region. Moreover, he argued that the opposition stemmed from the view that it "would be a breach of international law to attack a sovereign state and member of the UN that is not currently guilty of any external aggression; and two, that the execution of such an attack could lead to prolonged and unforeseeable adverse military and political consequences".

In December 2002, he argued that, in light of the UK Government's decision to allow the United States to use bases in Britain for its proposed anti-missile defence system ("Star Wars Mk II"), then Britain "should surely re-examine the utility to this country of the "special relationship" with America at the present degree of intimacy".

In January 2003, Barnett wrote that Britain's close relationship with the United States put Britain "in greater danger from Islamic terrorism rather than confers security against it. If we join in an attack on Iraq as America's satellite, that danger will become more acute".

Writing in August 2003, Barnett claimed that his predictions on the aftermath of the war had come to pass, saying that "some of us are on record since summer 2002 as warning that an attack on Iraq would end with the attackers bogged down in a politico-military mess of some kind or other". In September that same year Barnett likened the Iraq War to the Suez Crisis of 1956.

In December 2003, Barnett published an article in The Spectator, asserting that Al-Qaeda was winning the "war on terror"—a label Barnett rejects because "you cannot in logic wage war against a phenomenon, only against a specific enemy... America is combating not 'terrorism' but a specific terrorist network, al-Qa'eda". Barnett further claimed that terrorist organisations are "entirely rational in purpose and conduct" in that they conform to Clausewitzian ideas. He claims the invasions of Iraq and Afghanistan were mistaken in that they "opened up long American flanks vulnerable to increasing guerrilla attack: a classic case of strategic overextension" and that Saddam Hussein's regime had no links to Al-Qaeda. He claims that the United States Army in Iraq should be replaced with UN troops from Muslim states to quell resentment and to "isolate the insurgents". In order to defeat Al-Qaeda, Barnett argues, the United States should "recognise that combating terrorists is essentially a job for special forces like the SAS, for the police or gendarmerie (or troops trained in a gendarmerie role) and, above all, for good intelligence (meaning, at best, spies inside al-Qa'eda cells) – and not a job for heavy-weight hi-tech firepower".

After Lord Hutton published his report in early 2004, Barnett wrote that Lord Hutton's "conclusions are totally at variance with the wealth of documentary evidence and witness statements presented to his inquiry and published on the internet", citing Lord Hutton's claim that "there was no dishonourable or underhand strategy" in leaking Dr. David Kelly's name when Downing Street and the Ministry of Defence "conspired" to do so. Furthermore, he argued that Lord Hutton's "judgement is so unbalanced in its treatment of the BBC and of Downing Street and the MoD as to be worthless" except as a way for Tony Blair to "escape" from an investigation on "whether or not he did take us to war on a false prospectus".

After fellow military historian Sir John Keegan demanded to know why those who opposed the Iraq War wanted Saddam Hussein to remain in power, Barnett replied that "America, Britain, the Middle East and the wider world would be vastly better off in terms of peace and stability if Saddam were still gripping Iraq, and we were still gripping Saddam as we had been from 1991 to 2003". He explained that the condition of the Iraqi people under Saddam Hussein "is of no relevance" to non-Iraqis; secondly, he argued that Saddam Hussein "had presented no international danger since he was soundly beaten in the 1991 Gulf war. He possessed no weapons of mass destruction...and he was subject to close Anglo-American surveillance of the "no-fly zone""; thirdly, "Saddam had provided a highly competent ally, if a tacit one, in the so-called "war against global terror"" due to his opposition to Al-Qaeda.

During the 2005 general election, Barnett argued that George W. Bush and his friends "were bent on toppling Saddam Hussein in pursuit of an ideological mission to convert the Middle East to democracy" before Bush came to power in January 2001 and that the September 11 attacks "simply provided them with a convenient cover story". Barnett concluded by saying that Blair was "wholly unworthy of our trust. This is the central fact of this election, and we should vote accordingly". In late September 2005, Barnett argued that "'to cut and run' [from Iraq] would in fact be the morally brave thing to do" since the "current strategy is failing to produce the hoped-for results, but on the contrary is running ever deeper into difficulties and danger, and yet with the final result all in doubt". Barnett contrasted Blair to Clement Attlee, and his military withdrawals in India and Palestine, claiming that no British lives were lost in them.

In October 2005, he said of Margaret Thatcher:

Ever since the war we had lived in a form of state socialism with tremendous controls and regulations over economic and social life. I can remember when you couldn't even buy a house abroad without special permission from the Bank of England. People who think the pre-Thatcher years were a golden age really didn't live through them: just ask anyone who rode on the clapped-out railways or tried to make a telephone call when the Post Office ran the phones. When she came to power she transformed the country. The moribund industries relying on taxpayer funding - all gone. The trade unions - all gone. She abolished exchange controls, completely liquidated the state sector of industry and threw the economy wide open. It's certainly true that she was so powerful a person that cabinet government in the collegiate sense began to diminish. More and more they were like a collection of staff officers around the general. Blair has taken that further and deliberately adopted a presidential style in every possible way. The main difference was that she had genuine feeling, conviction and leadership. In my view, during the last eight years, Blair has proved a very plausible conman who promises much but hasn't achieved it.

== Honours ==
Barnett was a fellow of Churchill College, Cambridge and from 1977 to 1995 he was the Keeper of the Churchill Archives Centre. He was a fellow of the Royal Society of Literature, the Royal Historical Society and the Royal Society of Arts. From 1973 to 1985, he was a member of the Council of the Royal United Services Institute for Defence Studies. He was appointed a Commander of the Order of the British Empire.

== Influence ==
There were some Cabinet Ministers in Margaret Thatcher's government who were influenced by Barnett's works. Sir Keith Joseph, Education Secretary from 1981 to 1986, admired Barnett's work about the anti-business culture in education and in an interview with Anthony Seldon he proclaimed: "I'm a Correlli Barnett supporter". Nigel Lawson, Chancellor of the Exchequer from 1983 to 1989, also cited Barnett's views on education as an influence, specifically The Audit of War. In 1995 when Michael Heseltine became Deputy Prime Minister in John Major's Cabinet, he presented each member of the Cabinet with copies of Barnett's The Lost Victory. Barnett's comment that "an attack on Iran would effectively launch world war three" was cited by Noam Chomsky in his 2007 essay "A Predator Becomes More Dangerous Once Wounded".

== Personal life and death ==
In 1950, Barnett married Ruth Murby. The couple had two daughters. Ruth died in 2020.

Barnett died in East Carleton, Norfolk on 10 July 2022, aged 95.

== Writings ==
=== Books ===
- The Hump Organisation (1957)
- The Channel Tunnel (with Humphrey Slater, 1958)
- The Desert Generals (Kimber, 1960). A study of O'Connor, Alan Cunningham, Ritchie, Auchinleck and Montgomery.
- The Swordbearers: Supreme Command in the First World War (Eyre & Spottiswoode, 1963). A study of Moltke, Jellicoe, Pétain and Ludendorff.
- The Battle of El Alamein (Macmillan, 1964)
- Britain and Her Army, 1509–1970 (Allen Lane, 1970)
- The Collapse of British Power (Eyre Methuen, 1972)
- Marlborough (Eyre Methuen, 1974); US edition: The First Churchill: Marlborough, Soldier and Statesman (Putnam, 1974). An accompanying television programme was made.
- Strategy and Society (Manchester University Press, 1976)
- Human Factor and British Industrial Decline: An Historical Perspective (Working Together Campaign, 1977)
- Bonaparte (Allen & Unwin, 1978)
- The Great War (Park Lane Press, 1979)
- The Audit of War: The Illusion and Reality of Britain as a Great Nation (Macmillan, 1986); US edition: The Pride and the Fall: The Dream and Illusion of Britain as a Great Nation (The Free Press, 1987)
- Engage the Enemy More Closely: The Royal Navy in the Second World War (Hodder & Stoughton, 1991)
- The Lost Victory: British Dreams and British Realities, 1945-50 (Macmillan, 1995)
- The Verdict of Peace: Britain between her Yesterday and the Future (Macmillan, 2001)
- Post-conquest Civil Affairs: Comparing War's End in Iraq and in Germany (Foreign Policy Centre, 2005)
- Pétain (Weidenfeld & Nicolson, 2005)

=== Essays ===
- 'The New Military Balance', The History of the Twentieth Century, 24 (1968).
- 'The Guilt: The Illogical Promise', in G. A. Panichas (ed.), Promise of Greatness. The War of 1914-1918 (Littlehampton Book Services, 1968), pp. 560–572.
- 'The Education of Military Elites', in Rupert Wilkinson (ed.), Governing Elites: Studies in Training and Selection (Oxford University Press, 1964).
- 'Offensive 1918', in Noble Frankland and Christopher Dowling (eds.), Decisive Battles of the Twentieth Century (London: Sidgwick & Jackson, 1976), pp. 62–80.
- 'Auchinleck', in Michael Carver (ed.), The War Lords. Military Commanders of the Twentieth Century (Weidenfeld & Nicolson, 1976), pp. 260–273.
- 'Technology, Education and Industrial and Economic Strength, Education for Capability: Cantor Lecture 1, 13 November 1978', Journal of The Royal Society of Arts, cxxvii (5271), pp. 117–130.
- 'The Long Term Industrial Performance in the United Kingdom: The Role of Education and Research, 1850–1939', in Derek J. Morris (ed.), The Economic System of the United Kingdom. Third Edition (Oxford University Press, 1985), pp. 668–689.

== See also ==
- Richard Hilton (British Army officer)
