= The Myth of the Machine =

Two-volume nonfiction book by Lewis Mumford

- First edition
- Author: Lewis Mumford
- Language: English
- Published: 1967 (Vol.1) / 1970 (Vol.2) (Harcourt Brace Jovanovich)
- Media type: Print (2 Vols.)
- Pages: 352 pages (Vol. 1) / 495 pages (Vol. 2)
- ISBN: 0-15-163973-6 (Vol. 1 ) / ISBN 0-15-662341-2 (Vol. 2)

The Myth of the Machine is a two-volume book by Lewis Mumford that takes an in-depth look at the forces that have shaped modern technology since prehistoric times. The first volume, Technics and Human Development, was published in 1967, followed by the second volume, The Pentagon of Power, in 1970. Mumford shows the parallel developments between human tools and social organization mainly through language and rituals. It is considered a synthesis of many theories Mumford developed throughout his prolific writing career. Volume 2 was a Book-of-the-Month Club selection.

== Megamachine ==
"In The Myth of the Machine, Mumford insisted upon the reality of the Megamachine: the convergence of science, economy, technics and political power as a unified community of interpretation rendering useless and eccentric life-enhancing values. Subversion of this authoritarian kingdom begins with that area of human contact with the world that cannot be successfully repressed - one's feelings about one's self."

In the Prologue, Mumford defines his purpose here as "to question both the assumptions and the predictions upon which our commitment to the present forms of scientific and technical progress, treated as ends in themselves, have been based."

Mumford dates the emergence of the "Machine" from the pyramid age (primarily with reference to Egypt, but also acknowledging other ancient cultures in that era which produced massive and precisely engineered structures). Mumford draws an homology between this social structure and physical tools like the wheel, not only in their productive function but also in their physical power: "By operating as a single mechanical unit of specialized, subdivided, interlocking parts, the 100,000 men who worked on that pyramid could generate ten thousand horsepower". He uses the term 'Megamachine' to describe the social and bureaucratic structure that enabled a ruler to coordinate a huge workforce to undertake such vast and complex projects. Where the projects were public works such as irrigation systems and canals or the construction of cities, Mumford referred to the "labour machine", and where they involved conquest he used the expression "military machine". The term "Megamachine" connoted the social structure in its entirety.

Bruno Latour refers to Mumford and the Megamachine when discussing the development of sociotechnics, especially the modeling of nonhuman machines on the large-scale division of labor. Latour concurs with Mumford that "before having any notion of wheels, gears, works, and movements, you first need to have set up the very possibility of a large scale organization". Mumford similarly conceives of the Megamachine in contrast to the commonly held notion of man as the tool-making animal, first described by Thomas Carlyle in his 1836 novel Sartor Resartus. "In any adequate definition of technics, it should be plain that many insects, birds, and mammals had made far more radical innovations in the fabrication of containers, with their intricate nests and bowers, their geometric beehives, their urbanoid anthills and termitories, their beaver lodges, than man's ancestors had achieved in the making of tools until the emergence of Homo sapiens". Drawing from Plato, who "attributed man's emergence from a primitive state as much to Marsyas and Orpheus, the makers of music, as to fire-stealing Prometheus, or to Hephaestus", Mumford argues that man's unique identity comes from his "capacity to combine a wide identity of animal propensities into an emergent cultural entity: a human personality". Mumford also cites Johan Huizinga's notion of Homo ludens, insofar as "play, rather than work, was the formative element in human culture".

Mumford himself connects the Megamachine with John Maynard Keynes' notion of "pyramid building", from the latter's book The General Theory of Employment, Interest, and Money. The execution of monumental projects like the Great Pyramid of Giza or space rockets during the Space Race serve to redirect the Megamachine's excessive productivity into applications which justify the Megamachine. Hence although the Great Pyramid required the Megamachine to be constructed, the Megamachine also necessitated projects like the Great Pyramid to ideologically anchor itself.

=== The Future of Technics ===
William Manson writes that Mumford differed from other major critics of technology in that "[Mumford] emphasized that the ultimate function of social structures ("society") should be to enhance individual development and mutually beneficial patterns of social cooperation. Living in such conducive, humanly scaled communities, individuals could develop their many-sided capacities (moral/empathic, cognitive, aesthetic, etc.). Technical means, if limited to these human purposes and values, could enhance such growth and social well-being."

== Volume I, Technics and Human Development ==
In this volume Mumford discusses the progress of terrestrial exploration, and scientific discovery; and traces the interplay of ideological interests, inventions and subjective drives in the evolution of human society. It expands upon the arguments he earlier promoted in Technics and Civilization (1934), and brings them up to date in the light of social developments in the intervening three decades. In the Preface he writes: "...I have been driven, by the wholesale miscarriage of megatechnics, to deal with the collective obsessions and compulsions that have misdirected our energies, and undermined our abilities to live full and spiritually satisfying lives."

== Volume II, The Pentagon of Power ==
The "Pentagon of Power" refers to five aspects of what Mumford calls "the new power complex" of military and industry in industrialized nation-states:

- Politics
- Power (in the sense of physical energy)
- Productivity
- Profit
- Publicity

The "pentagon" was also clearly selected to be in reference to the Pentagon, regarding which Mumford commented: "The concrete form of the Pentagon in Washington serves even better than its Soviet counterpart, the Kremlin, as a symbol of totalitarian absolutism: all the more because this particular megastructure combines a pathetically outmoded Renascence plan with the current wasteful and inefficient facilities for monotransportation by car." Mumford found an important aspect of the Pentagon, as a physical structure symbolizing the object of his critique, the way that it functions as an enclosed "citadel" in which the U.S. military's elite make decisions, cut off from the world in which they act.

Although much of the volume explores the negative influence of centralised power and exploitative behaviour on the human condition, it finishes on a positive and optimistic note in the closing chapters. His final remark is:

"But for those of us who have thrown off the myth of the machine, the next move is ours: for the gates of the technocratic prison will open automatically, despite their rusty ancient hinges, as soon as we choose to walk out."

== Bibliography ==
- Mumford, Lewis, 1970. The Pentagon of Power: Harcourt Brace Jovanovich. ISBN 0-15-163974-4.
- Lewis Mumford, Reflections, "REFLECTIONS I-THE MEGAMACHINE," The New Yorker, October 10, 1970, p. 50 abstract
