= The City in History =

Nonfiction book by Lewis Mumford

- First edition
- Author: Lewis Mumford
- Language: English
- Publisher: Harcourt, Brace and World
- Publication date: 1961
- Publication place: United States
- Media type: Print
- Pages: 657
- ISBN: 0-15-618035-9
- OCLC: 7102629

The City in History: Its Origins, Its Transformations, and Its Prospects is a 1961 National Book Award winner by American historian Lewis Mumford.

It was first published by Harcourt, Brace & World (New York).

== Synopsis ==
Mumford argues for a world not in which technology rules, but rather in which it achieves a balance with nature. His ideal vision is what can be described as an "organic city," where culture is not usurped by technological innovation but rather thrives with it. Mumford contrasts these cities with those constructed around wars, tyrants, poverty, etc. The book is not an attack on the city, but rather an evaluation of its growth, how it came to be, and where it is heading, as evidenced by the final chapter "Retrospect and Prospect."

Mumford notes apologetically in his preface that his "method demands personal experience and observation," and that therefore he has "confined [him]self as far as possible to cities and regions [he is] acquainted with at first hand."

== Style ==
Mumford's florid writing style is also "organic" to the work. Stylistically, his works are full of metaphors and similes, as well as quotations from famous novelists, giving his prose shades of poetry. He refers to such texts as Great Expectations and Hard Times, sometimes using citations to illustrate to the reader what life was like during the industrial era and the city in which Dickens lived.

Articles have been written on Mumford's use of metaphor and how his works can often be read as "fiction", in the sense that they have narrative flow. That is evident in this book, in which, instead of a human protagonist on which the story centers, we have the city and its growth in a quasi-bildungsroman fashion.

== Editions ==
- Hardcover, MJF Books (August 1997) ISBN 978-1-56731-211-9
- Paperback, Harvest Books (October 1968) ISBN 978-0-15-618035-1
