= East Carleton =

Village in Norfolk, England

Coordinates: 52.573°N 1.210°E

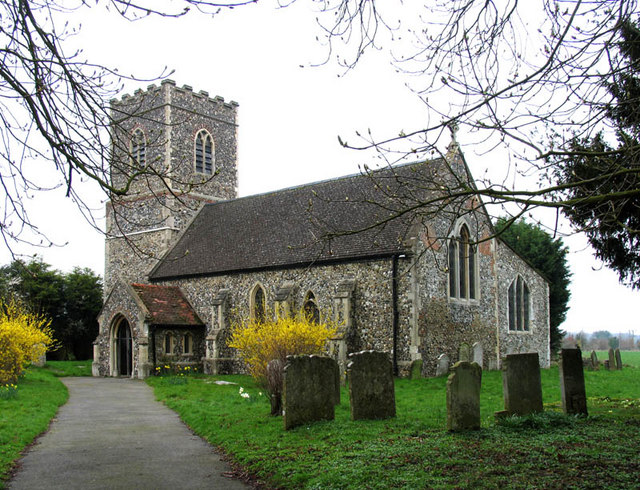
- St. Mary's Church

- Location within Norfolk
- Area: 1.92 sq mi (5.0 km^{2})
- Population: 341
  - Density: 178/sq mi (69/km^{2})
- OS grid reference: TG176020
  - London: 149 kilometres (93 mi)
- Civil parish: East Carleton
- District: South Norfolk
- Shire county: Norfolk
- Region: East
- Country: England
- Sovereign state: United Kingdom
- Post town: NORWICH
- Postcode district: NR14
- Dialling code: 01508
- Police: Norfolk
- Fire: Norfolk
- Ambulance: East of England
- UK Parliament: South Norfolk

East Carleton is a village and civil parish in the English county of Norfolk.

East Carleton is located 3.9 miles (6.3 km) east of nearby Wymondham and 5.3 miles (8.5 km) south-west of Norwich.

== Etymology ==
East Carleton's name is of Anglo-Saxon and Viking origin and derives from an amalgamation of the Old English and Old Norse for the settlement or farmstead of the freemen.

== History ==
In the Domesday Book, East Carleton is listed as a settlement of 58 households in the hundred of Humbleyard. In 1086, the village was divided between the estates of Roger Bigod, Ralph de Beaufour and Ranulf de Peverel.

The village has good examples of surviving Sixteenth, Seventeenth and Nineteenth Century residential architecture.

== Geography ==
According to the 2021 census, East Carleton has a total population of 341 people which demonstrates a minor decrease from the 343 people listed in the 2011 census.

== St. Mary's Church ==
East Carleton's parish church is dedicated to Saint Mary and is Medieval in origin. St. Mary's is located on Rectory Road and has been Grade II listed since 1959.

St. Mary's was heavily restored in the Victorian era with the chancel being re-built in the 1880s and the churchtower a decade later. St. Mary's features examples of Nineteenth and Twentieth Century stained glass including an Angel of Charity installed by James Powell and Sons and a depiction of Saint Mary and Christ by Heaton, Butler and Bayne.

== Notable residents ==
- Correlli Barnett CBE- (1927-2022) military historian, died in East Carleton.

== Governance ==
East Carleton is part of the electoral ward of Mulbarton & Stoke Holy Cross for local elections and is part of the district of South Norfolk.

The village's national constituency is South Norfolk which has been represented by the Labour's Ben Goldsborough MP since 2024.

== War Memorial ==
East Carleton's war memorial is a stone plaque inside St. Mary's Church as well as a small cross of sacrifice at the junction of Catbridge Lane and Intwood Lane. The memorial lists the following names for the First World War:

Rank	Name	Unit	Date of death	Burial
Maj.	John H. Steward	3rd Bn., Norfolk Regiment	10 May 1915	St. Mary's Churchyard
LCpl.	Gilbert H. Bailey	2nd Bn., Norfolk Regt.	22 Apr. 1916	Basra Memorial
Dvr.	William J. Rowling	Royal Field Artillery	13 Aug. 1918	Frechencourt Cemetery
Pte.	Arthur W. Dawson	3rd Bn., Norfolk Regiment	6 Mar. 1915	Walton Cemetery, Felixstowe
Pte.	Arthur Townsend	2nd Bn., Queen's Own Regiment	13 May 1917	Arras Memorial
Pte.	Ernest H. Sparkes	2nd Bn., South Staffordshire Regiment	5 May 1918	Cabaret-Rouge Cemetery
Spr.	Cecil E. Beckett	207th Coy., Royal Engineers	27 Aug. 1916	Bois-Guillaume Cemetery

And, George B. Crowe.
