= Herman Melville (book) =

1929 biography of Herman Melville

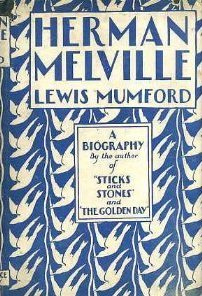
- Author: Lewis Mumford
- Language: English
- Subject: Herman Melville
- Publisher: Harcourt, Brace & Company
- Publication date: 1929

Herman Melville is a biography of the American author Herman Melville by Lewis Mumford, first published in 1929. Mumford, who felt a close affinity with Melville, gives both an account of the author's life and an interpretation of his works in the book, devoting particular attention to Moby-Dick and the later works published thereafter. The book played a role in the Melville revival of the 1920s, helping to affirm the author's reputation and to indicate connections between his work and later literature. The book was later republished under the title Herman Melville: A Study of His Life and Vision.

== Conception and publication ==
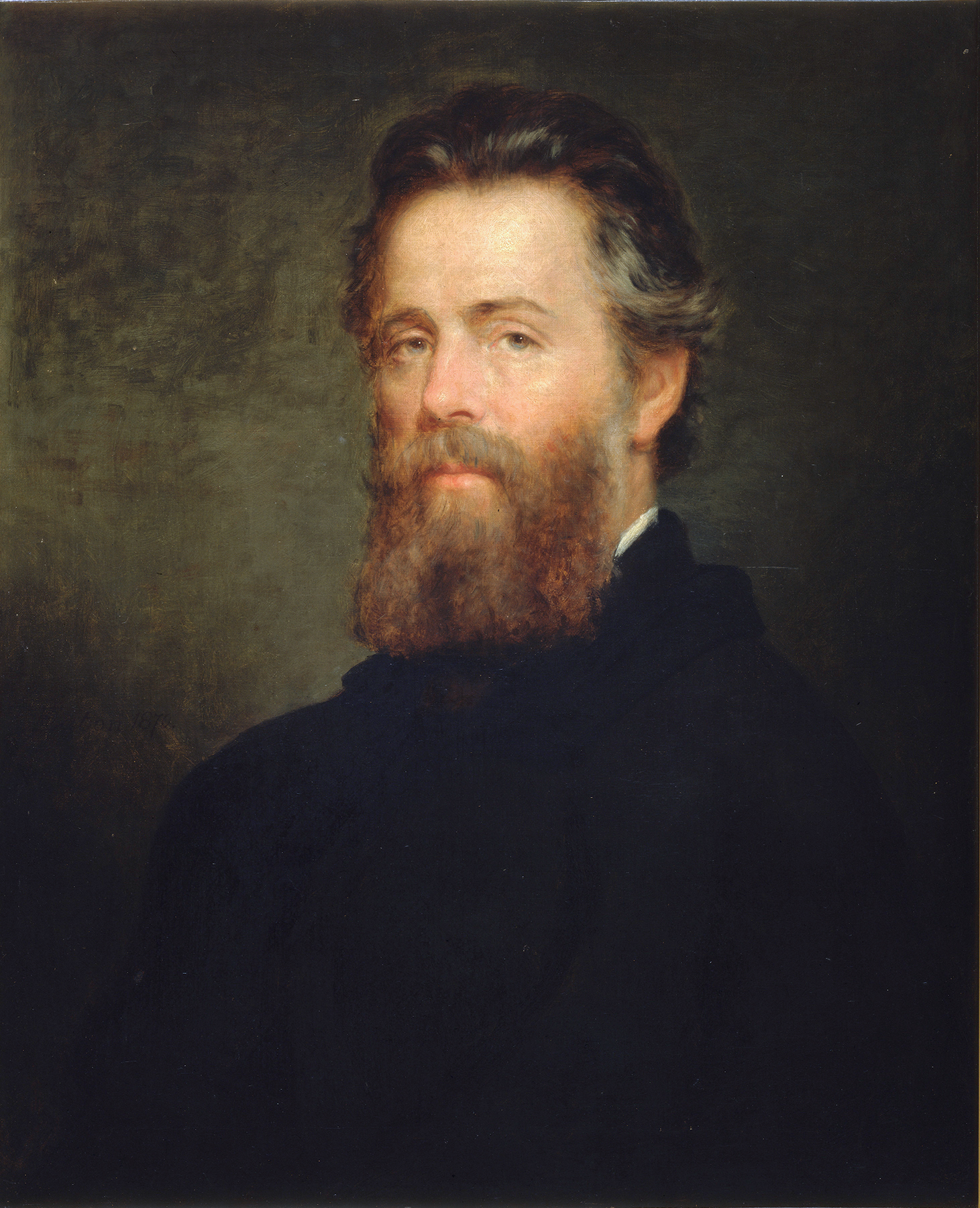
Herman Melville, as depicted in 1870 by Joseph Oriel Eaton

Lewis Mumford viewed Herman Melville as a kindred spirit with whom he shared certain concerns and problems, as well as certain life experiences. Mumford was intrigued by Melville's personality, his personal development and his vision of life, and saw Melville as an unorthodox moral philosopher. He had previously discussed Melville in his book The Golden Day (1926), in which he had argued for a mid-19th-century American literary canon comprising Melville alongside Ralph Waldo Emerson, Henry David Thoreau, Nathaniel Hawthorne and Walt Whitman, all of whom he argued reflected the American culture of the period, which would soon be destroyed by the American Civil War and late-19th-century industrialization.

Conceiving of the biography in 1927, Mumford envisioned it as the most ambitious project of his career to that point. The book was written over the space of a year, in what he described to his friend Henry Murray as a state of near "euphoria". Mumford visited the New York Public Library to examine the correspondence of Melville's friend Evert Augustus Duyckinck and read Melville's own journals, provided to him by the author's granddaughter. His research for the book was subject to financial constraints: he and his wife were expecting a child, and so he aimed for the book to be published by early 1929. Mumford's three previous books had been published by Boni & Liveright, but Horace Liveright was unenthusiastic about the Melville biography, so Mumford went instead to Harcourt, Brace & Company. On its publication, Herman Melville was selected for Carl Van Doren's Literary Guild. A revised edition was published in 1962 with the title Herman Melville: A Study of His Life and Vision.

== Overview ==
Herman Melville includes an account of Melville's life and an interpretive discussion of his writing. Mumford takes Melville's fiction as indicative of aspects of his psyche; in its effort to understand Melville's mind through his work, Herman Melville is an early example of a psychological biography. While Mumford takes Melville's novels, including Typee, Omoo, Redburn and White-Jacket, as clues to events in his life, they were in fact largely fictional and did not significantly draw on the author's own experiences. Most of the errors resulting from this misapprehension were removed from the 1962 revised edition.

Mumford draws on Raymond Weaver's Herman Melville: Mariner and Mystic (1921), the first full biography of Melville. Mumford, however, diverges from Weaver by discussing Melville's later life (the forty-year period between the publication of Moby-Dick and his death) in some depth, while devoting less attention to the author's years at sea. Mumford argues that in these later years Melville was able to rehabilitate himself psychically. Whereas previous studies had neglected Melville's later writing, Mumford's consideration of this body of work allowed him to frame the trajectory of Melville's career in a new way.

In his discussion of Moby-Dick, Mumford dismisses critics who described the novel as a failure or incoherent, arguing instead that the work "stands by itself as complete as the Divine Comedy or the Odyssey stands by itself." Mumford views Moby-Dick as an integration of scientific study and imaginative thought, which thereby reconciled two opposing tendencies in modern life. He views the novel as an allegory for humanity's efforts to find purpose, and a pointer to a new age characterised by organic balance. Mumford argues that in Moby-Dick Melville demonstrated his awareness of the existence of evil, and his refusal to allow it to overwhelm him, while simultaneously seeking to give a degree of moral purpose or meaning to life. Mumford identifies the white whale as the novel's central figure, and argues it represents the universe and the conjunction of nature and destiny, whereas Captain Ahab, in Mumford's reading, represents humanity's ultimate insignificance and signifies the necessity of confronting evil not with power but with love.

== Critical reception ==
=== Contemporary reviews ===
Critics reviewing the biography tended to agree that it was the most comprehensive work on Melville then available, though some reviewers argued that Mumford overstated Melville's significance and the greatness of Moby-Dick.

Reviewing the book in The New England Quarterly in 1929, Henry Murray described Mumford as "the most fluent and unequivocal" of Melville's biographers and praised his "poetic vision and ... intimate knowledge of the cultural series in America". Murray praised Mumford's account of Melville's relation to his age and his judgement of his literary works, including his "eloquently definitive" interpretation of Moby-Dick. Murray concludes that Herman Melville "is so lucid that the reader is never lost, but remains a willing and appreciative listener to the end."

John Brooks Moore, reviewing the book in American Literature in 1929, acknowledged Mumford's expertise on his subject, while observing that parts of the book appear to be as much about Mumford himself as about Melville. Moore described the chapters covering Moby-Dick and Pierre as "the most complete, eloquent and inescapable writing that has so far been done upon Melville", but argued that other sections of the book are much less successful. Moore finds Mumford's interpretation of Melville's later life as a period of spiritual rehabilitation "wholly unproved and far from plausible."

Herbert Gorman of The New York Times, also in 1929, described the book as both "the best book on Melville that we have" and the best of Mumford's books. Gorman credits Mumford with depicting Melville's life as "a superb and (at the time) unrecognized victory" by placing him in his historical context and examining the spiritual aspects of his life, but argues that Mumford is insufficiently attentive to the tragic elements of Melville's life. Gorman accuses Mumford of overstating the value of certain of Melville's works, but praises Mumford's clear affection for his subject and argues that "this loving seal on the part of a biographer can hardly be called a fault".

George Orwell's review, published in the New Adelphi in 1930, took issue with Mumford's interpretation of Melville's work and accused him of over-interpreting Moby-Dick, but praised his interpretation of Melville himself and his account of how Melville was influenced by the events of the 19th century. Orwell (writing under his real name E. A. Blair) wrote that Mumford had "altogether too keen an eye for the inner meaning", but found that this tendency "does not seriously spoil the book, because Mr Mumford is concerned with Melville's mind as a whole rather than his mere artistry." Orwell concluded that the book would be of interest to admirers of Melville, who would be encouraged by it to read beyond his best-known and most successful works.

=== Later evaluations ===
In his 1989 biography of Mumford, Donald L. Miller argues that Mumford closely identified with Melville, to the point that "at times it is impossible to tell whether Mumford is writing about Herman Melville or about himself", and described Herman Melville as Mumford's "most self-revealing book and the clearest expression of his matured moral outlook." Miller argues that Mumford saw the book as "an opportunity to deal with moral and explosively personal issues he had treated only cursorily and rather callowly in his previous writings." Miller identifies Mumford's reading of Moby-Dick as the book's high point, and describes it as effecting "a fusion of novelist and biographer which creates a tone unlike any modern biography."

Miller also notes that Mumford often goes too far in drawing connections between Melville's work and his life, and that later researchers would conclude that Melville's autobiographical fiction was not a reliable source of information about his experiences, as Mumford had taken it to be. Additionally, Miller argues that Mumford failed to consult, or to adequately scrutinize, certain sources that were available to him due to his haste to publish the book. In his 2007 discussion of Mumford and Murray's friendship, Frank G. Novak, Jr. argues that Herman Melville marks a transitional moment in Mumford's career: where previously "his books [were] concerned almost exclusively with American art and culture," he later came to address a much broader range of topics. Reviewing biographies of Melville in 2018, Ian Maloney argued that Mumford's book "remains useful as a work of criticism, but is less reliable as a biography, per se."

== Impact ==
Published at the height of the Melville revival, Mumford's book helped to solidify Melville's status as a globally significant author. As well as reaffirming Melville's importance, Mumford contributed to an awareness of continuities between his work and the literary modernism of the 1920s. Eric Aronoff argues that Mumford's reading of Moby-Dick as an organic whole that functions as a synecdoche for the society in which it was produced anticipates themes in the New Criticism that would emerge in the 1930s.
