= Lewis Mumford =

American scholar and writer (1895–1990)

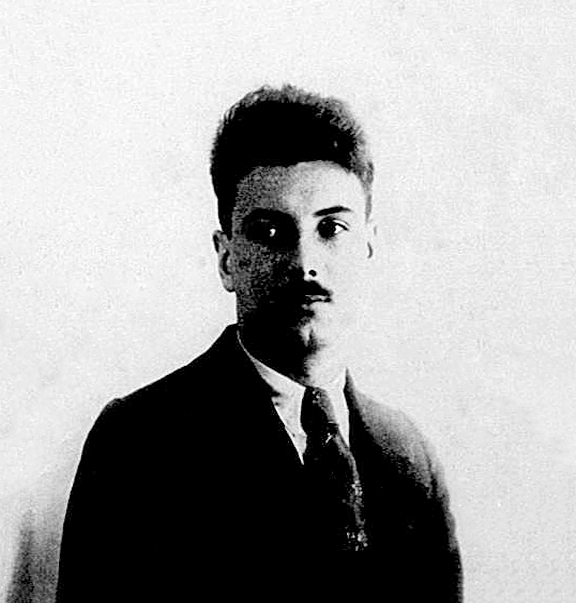
- Passport application, 1920
- Born: October 19, 1895; Flushing, New York, U.S.
- Died: January 26, 1990 (aged 94); Amenia, New York, U.S.
- Education: City College of New York; The New School
- Occupations: Historian; writer
- Writing career
- Genres: History; philosophy of technology
- Notable works: The City in History; Technics and Civilization; The Myth of the Machine
- Notable awards: Leonardo da Vinci Medal (1969)

Lewis Mumford (October 19, 1895 – January 26, 1990) was an American historian, sociologist, philosopher of technology, and literary critic. Particularly noted for his study of cities and urban architecture, he had a broad career as a writer. He made significant contributions to social philosophy, American literary and cultural history, and the history of technology.

Mumford was influenced by the work of Scottish theorist Sir Patrick Geddes and worked closely with his associate the British sociologist Victor Branford. Mumford was also a contemporary and friend of Frank Lloyd Wright, Clarence Stein, Frederic Osborn, Edmund N. Bacon, and Vannevar Bush.

== Life ==
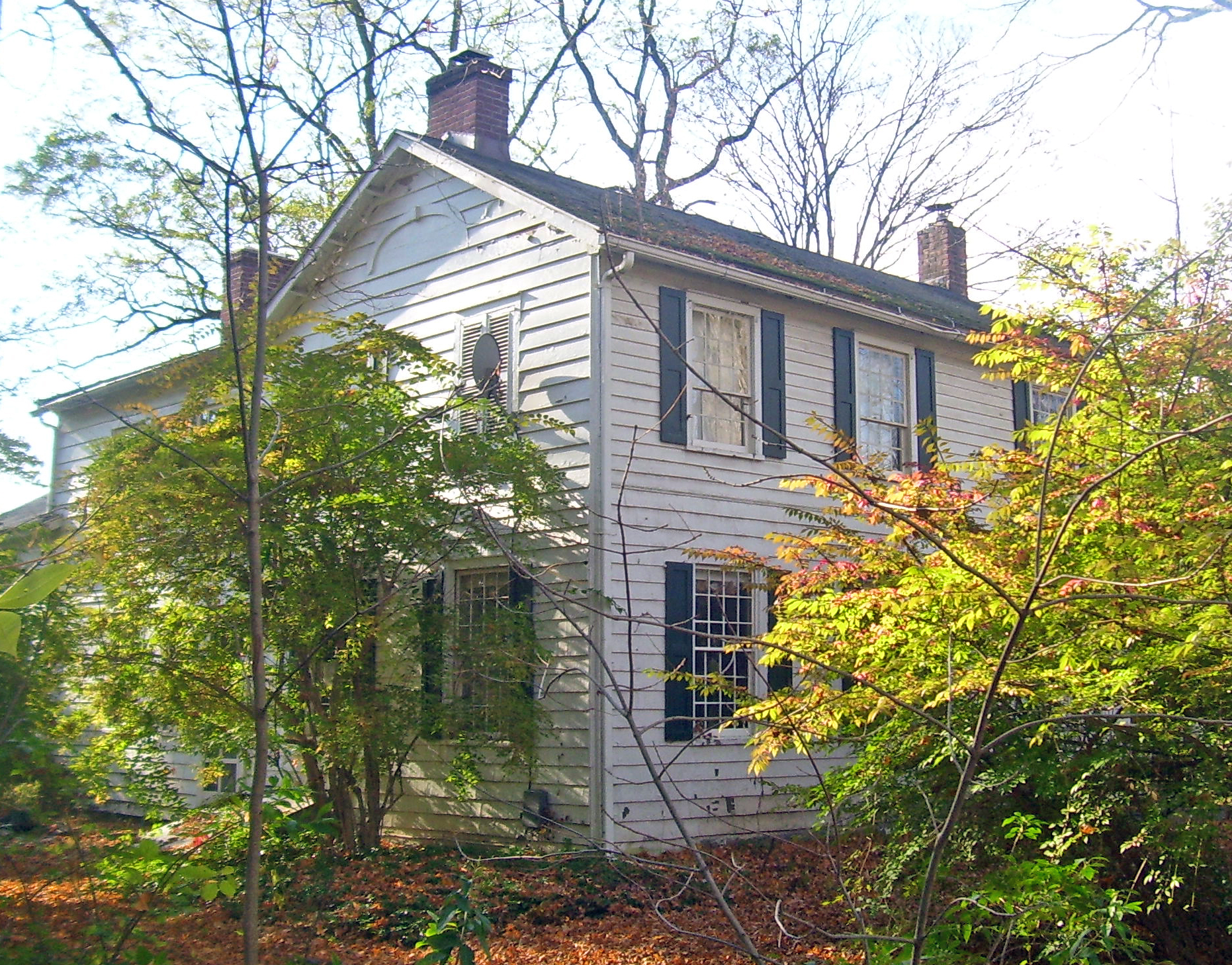
Mumford's house in Amenia

=== Early life and education ===
Mumford was born in Flushing, Queens, New York, and graduated from Stuyvesant High School in 1912. He studied at the City College of New York and The New School for Social Research, but became ill with tuberculosis and never finished his degree. In 1918 he joined the Navy to serve in World War I and was assigned as a radio electrician. He was discharged in 1919 and became associate editor of The Dial, an influential modernist literary journal. He later worked for The New Yorker where he wrote architectural criticism and commentary on urban issues.

=== First book ===
Mumford's earliest books in the field of literary criticism have had a lasting influence on contemporary American literary criticism. His first book was The Story of Utopias (1922), an insightful exploration of the many visions of a better world that influenced the development of modern urban planning theory. In The Golden Day (1926), he argued for a mid-19th-century American literary canon comprising Herman Melville, Ralph Waldo Emerson, Henry David Thoreau, Nathaniel Hawthorne and Walt Whitman, all of whom he argued reflected an antebellum American culture of the period that would be destroyed by the late-19th-century social changes wrought by the American Civil War and industrialization of the United States. Herman Melville (1929), which combined an account of Melville's life with an interpretive discussion of his work, was an important part of the Melville revival.

=== Correspondence ===
Mumford was a close friend of the psychologist Henry Murray, with whom he corresponded extensively from 1928 until the 1960s on topics including Herman Melville, psychology, American values and culture, and the nature of the self.

=== Urban planning ===
In his early writings on life in an urban area, Mumford was optimistic about human abilities, arguing that the human race would use electricity and mass communication to build a better world for all humankind. Mumford later took a more pessimistic stance on the sweeping technological improvements brought by the Second Industrial Revolution. His early architectural criticism helped to bring wider public recognition to the work of Henry Hobson Richardson, Louis Sullivan and Frank Lloyd Wright.

=== Honours ===
Mumford was elected to the American Philosophical Society in 1941 and the American Academy of Arts and Sciences in 1947. In 1963, Mumford received the Frank Jewett Mather Award for art criticism from the College Art Association. Mumford received the Presidential Medal of Freedom in 1964. In 1975 Mumford was made an honorary Knight Commander of the Order of the British Empire (KBE). In 1976, he was awarded the Prix mondial Cino Del Duca. In 1986, he was awarded the National Medal of Arts.

=== Further publications ===
He served as the architectural critic for The New Yorker magazine for over 30 years. His 1961 book, The City in History, received the National Book Award.

=== Death ===
Lewis Mumford died at the age of 94 at his home in Amenia, New York, on January 26, 1990. Nine years later the house was listed on the National Register of Historic Places. His wife Sophia died in 1997, at age 97.

== Ideas ==
In his book The Condition of Man, published in 1944, Mumford characterized his orientation toward the study of humanity as "organic humanism." The term is important because it sets limits on human possibilities, limits that are aligned with the nature of the human body. Mumford never forgot the importance of air quality, of food availability, of the quality of water, or the comfort of spaces, because all these elements had to be respected if people were to thrive. Technology and progress could never become a runaway train in his reasoning, so long as organic humanism was there to act as a brake. Indeed, Mumford considered the human brain from this perspective, characterizing it as hyperactive, a good thing in that it allowed humanity to conquer many of nature's threats, but potentially a bad thing if it were not occupied in ways that stimulated it meaningfully. Mumford's respect for human "nature", that is to say, the natural characteristics of being human, provided him with a platform from which to assess technologies, and techniques in general. Thus his criticism and counsel with respect to the city and with respect to the implementation of technology was fundamentally organized around the organic humanism to which he subscribed. It was from the perspective of organic humanism that Mumford eventually launched a critical assessment of Marshall McLuhan, who argued that the technology, not the natural environment, would ultimately shape the nature of humankind, a possibility that Mumford recognized, but only as a nightmare scenario.

Mumford believed that what defined humanity, what set human beings apart from other animals, was not primarily our use of tools (technology) but our use of language (symbols). He was convinced that the sharing of information and ideas amongst participants of primitive societies was completely natural to early humanity, and had obviously been the foundation of society as it became more sophisticated and complex. He had hopes for a continuation of this process of information "pooling" in the world as humanity moved into the future. Mumford's choice of the word "technics" throughout his work was deliberate. For Mumford, technology is one part of technics. Using the broader definition of the Greek tekhne, which means not only technology but also art, skill, and dexterity, technics refers to the interplay of social milieu and technological innovation—the "wishes, habits, ideas, goals" as well as "industrial processes" of a society. As Mumford writes at the beginning of Technics and Civilization, "other civilizations reached a high degree of technical proficiency without, apparently, being profoundly influenced by the methods and aims of technics."

=== Megatechnics ===
In The Myth of the Machine Vol II: The Pentagon of Power (Chapter 12) (1970), Mumford criticizes the modern trend of technology, which emphasizes constant, unrestricted expansion, production, and replacement. He contends that these goals work against technical perfection, durability, social efficiency, and overall human satisfaction. Modern technology, which he called "megatechnics," fails to produce lasting, quality products by using devices such as consumer credit, installment buying, non-functioning and defective designs, planned obsolescence, and frequent superficial "fashion" changes. "Without constant enticement by advertising," he writes, "production would slow down and level off to normal replacement demand. Otherwise many products could reach a plateau of efficient design which would call for only minimal changes from year to year." He uses his own refrigerator as an example, reporting that it "has been in service for nineteen years, with only a single minor repair: an admirable job. Both automatic refrigerators for daily use and deepfreeze preservation are inventions of permanent value. ... [O]ne can hardly doubt that if biotechnic criteria were heeded, rather than those of market analysts and fashion experts, an equally good product might come forth from Detroit, with an equally long prospect of continued use."

=== Biotechnics ===
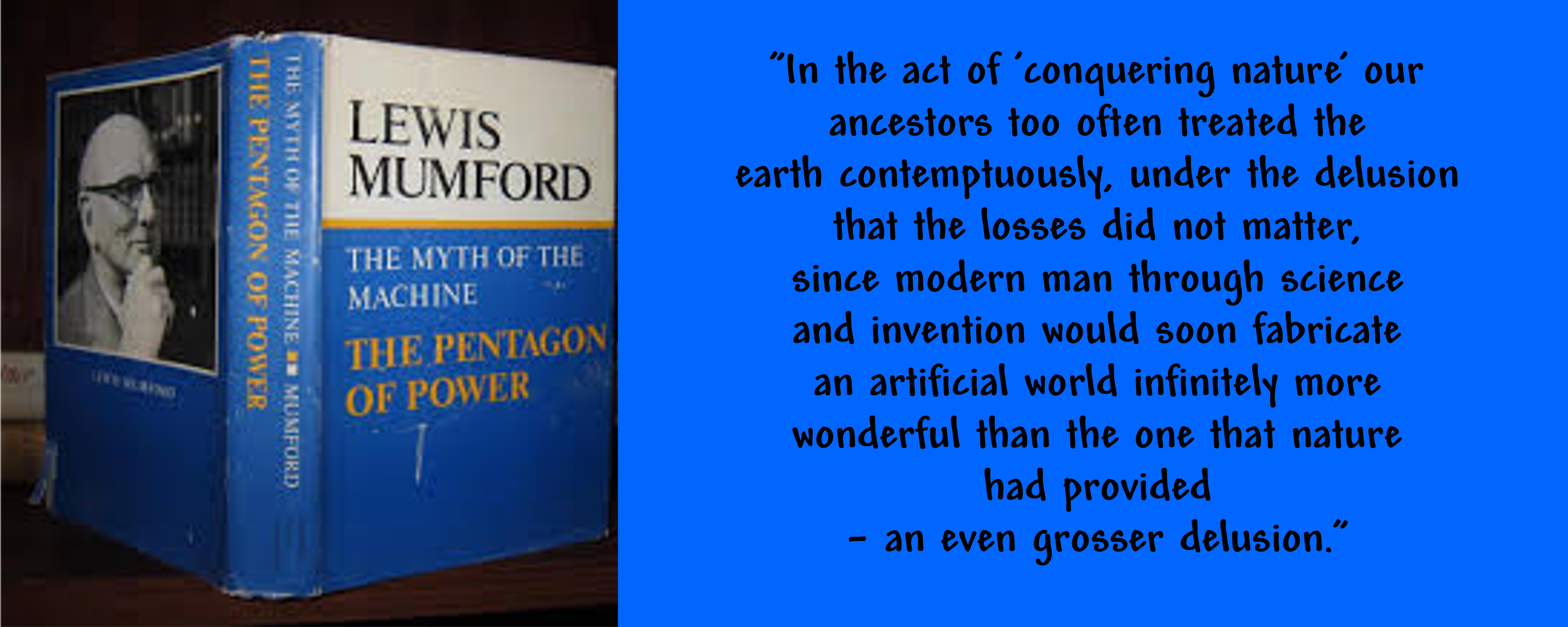
The Pentagon of Power picture and a quote from it.

Mumford used the term Biotechnics for a form of technology and technological development that oriented toward biological and ecological processes. This is contrast by Megatechnics, being large-scale, centralized technological systems. Biotechnics factor in and aims to accommodate technological activity to the need of living organism and their environment, rather than treating the environment primarily as a resource to be controlled and exploit.

The term bioviability is sometimes used to describe the capacity of an environment to sustain life, although it was used by Mumford. According to Mumford, technological development did not have to result in ecological damage, however, because he held it was possible to create technologies that functioned in an ecologically responsible manner, and he called that sort of technology biotechnics. He argued instead for technologies and social organizations structure that maintain the reciprocal relationship between human communities and their biological environment.

Mumford also associated the development of biotechnics with a growing "ecological consciousness", it being a way of understanding life that extended from Darwinian and Neo-Darwinian understanding of life, in which organisms are understood in relation to their environments and to one another. According to Mumford, a society organized around biotechnics restrain its technology in the interest of preserving the mutually-influencing relationship between the state of living organism and the state of its environment.

In Mumford's understanding, the various technologies that arose in the megatechnic context have brought unintended and harmful side effects along with the obvious benefits they have bequeathed to us. He points out, for example, that the development of money (as a technology) created, as a side effect, a context for irrational accumulation of excess because it eliminated the burdensome aspects of object-wealth by making wealth abstract. In those eras when wealth was not abstract, plenitude had functioned as the organizing principle around its acquisition (i.e., wealth, measured in grains, lands, animals, to the point that one is satisfied, but not saddled with it). Money, which allows wealth to be conceived as pure quantity instead of quality, is an example of megatechnics, one which can spiral out of control. If Mumford is right in this conceptualization, historians and economists should be able to trace a relationship between the still-increasing abstraction of wealth and radical transformations with respect to wealth's distribution and role. And, indeed, it does appear that, alongside its many benefits, the movement toward electronic money has stimulated forms of economic stress and exploitation not yet fully understood and not yet come to their conclusion. A technology for distributing resources that was less given to abstract hoarding would be more suitable to a biotechnic conception of living.

Thus, Mumford argued that the biotechnic society would not hold to the megatechnic delusion that technology must expand unceasingly, magnifying its own power and would shatter that delusion in order to create and preserve "livability." Rather than the megatechnic pursuit of power, the biotechnic society would pursue what Mumford calls "plenitude"; that is, a homeostatic relationship between resources and needs. This notion of plenitude becomes clearer if we suggest that the biotechnic society would relate to its technology in the manner an animal relates to available food–under circumstances of natural satisfaction, the pursuit of technological advance would not simply continue "for its own sake". Alongside the limiting effect of satisfaction amidst plenitude, the pursuit of technological advance would also be limited by its potentially negative effects upon the organism. Thus, in a biotechnic society, the quality of air, the quality of food, and the quality of water would all be significant concerns that could limit any technological ambitions threatening to them. The anticipated negative value of noise, radiation, smog, noxious chemicals, and other technical by-products would significantly constrain the introduction of new technical innovation. In Mumford's words, a biotechnic society would direct itself toward "qualitative richness, amplitude, spaciousness, and freedom from quantitative pressures and crowding. Self-regulation, self-correction, and self-propulsion are as much an integral property of organisms as nutrition, reproduction, growth, and repair." The biotechnic society would pursue balance, wholeness, and completeness; and this is what those individuals in pursuit of biotechnics would do as well.

Mumford's critique of the city and his vision of cities that are organized around the nature of human bodies, so essential to all Mumford's work on city life and urban design, is rooted in an incipient notion of biotechnics: "livability," a notion which Mumford got from his mentor, Patrick Geddes. Mumford used the term biotechnics in the later sections of The Pentagon of Power, written in 1970. The term sits well alongside his early characterization of "organic humanism," in that biotechnics represent the concrete form of technique that appeals to an organic humanist. When Mumford described biotechnics, automotive and industrial pollution had become dominant technological concerns, along with the fear of nuclear annihilation. Mumford recognized, however, that technology had even earlier produced a plethora of hazards, and that it would do so into the future. For Mumford, human hazards are rooted in a power-oriented technology that does not adequately respect and accommodate the essential nature of humanity. Mumford is stating implicitly, as others would later state explicitly, that contemporary human life understood in its ecological sense is out of balance because the technical parts of its ecology (guns, bombs, cars, drugs) have spiraled out of control, driven by forces peculiar to them rather than constrained by the needs of the species that created them. He believed that biotechnics was the emerging answer and the only hope that could be set out against the problem of megatechnics. It was an answer, he believed, that was already beginning to assert itself in his time.

It is true that Mumford's writing privileges the term "biotechnics" more than the "biotechnic society." The reason is clear in the last sentence of The Pentagon of Power where he writes, "for those of us who have thrown off the myth of the machine, the next move is ours: for the gates of the technocratic prison will open automatically, despite their rusty ancient hinges, as soon as we choose to walk out." Mumford believed that the biotechnic society was a desideratum—one that should guide his contemporaries as they walked out the doors of their megatechnic confines (he also calls them "coffins"). Thus he ends his narrative, as he well understood, at the beginning of another one: the possible revolution that gives rise to a biotechnic society, a quiet revolution, for Mumford, one that would arise from the biotechnic consciousness and actions of individuals. Mumford was an avid reader of Alfred North Whitehead's philosophy of the organism.

=== Polytechnics and Monotechnics ===
A key idea, introduced in Technics and Civilization (1934) was that technology was twofold:

- Polytechnic, which enlists many different modes of technology, providing a complex framework to solve human problems.
- Monotechnic, which is technology only for its own sake, which oppresses humanity as it moves along its own trajectory.

Mumford commonly criticized modern America's transportation networks as being "monotechnic" in their reliance on cars. Automobiles become obstacles for other modes of transportation, such as walking, bicycle and public transit, because the roads they use consume so much space and are such a danger to people. Mumford explains that the thousands of maimed and dead each year as a result of automobile accidents are a ritual sacrifice the American society makes because of its extreme reliance on highway transport.

=== Three epochs of civilization ===
Also discussed at length in Technics and Civilization is Mumford's division of human civilization into three distinct epochs (following concepts originated by Patrick Geddes):

- Eotechnic (the Middle Ages)
- Paleotechnic (the time of the Industrial Revolution) and
- Neotechnic (later, present-day)

=== Megamachines ===
Mumford also refers to large hierarchical organizations as megamachines—a machine using humans as its components. These organizations characterize Mumford's stage theory of civilization. The most recent megamachine manifests itself, according to Mumford, in modern technocratic nuclear powers—Mumford used the examples of the Soviet and United States power complexes represented by the Kremlin and the Pentagon, respectively. The builders of the pyramids, the Roman Empire and the armies of the World Wars are prior examples.

He explains that meticulous attention to accounting and standardization, and elevation of military leaders to divine status, are spontaneous features of megamachines throughout history. He cites such examples as the repetitive nature of Egyptian paintings which feature enlarged pharaohs and public display of enlarged portraits of Communist leaders such as Mao Zedong and Joseph Stalin. He also cites the overwhelming prevalence of quantitative accounting records among surviving historical fragments, from ancient Egypt to Nazi Germany.

Necessary to the construction of these megamachines is an enormous bureaucracy of humans which act as "servo-units", working without ethical involvement. According to Mumford, technological improvements such as the assembly line, or instant, global, Wireless, communication and remote control, can easily weaken the perennial psychological barriers to certain types of questionable actions. An example which he uses is that of Adolf Eichmann, the Nazi official who organized logistics in support of the Holocaust. Mumford collectively refers to people willing to carry out placidly the extreme goals of these megamachines as "Eichmanns".

=== The clock as herald of the Industrial Revolution ===
One of the better-known studies of Mumford is of the way the mechanical clock was developed by monks in the Middle Ages and subsequently adopted by the rest of society. He viewed this device as the key invention of the whole Industrial Revolution, contrary to the common view of the steam engine holding the prime position, writing: "The clock, not the steam-engine, is the key-machine of the modern industrial age. ... The clock ... is a piece of power-machinery whose 'product' is seconds and minutes ...."

=== Urban civilization ===
The City in History won the 1962 U.S. National Book Award for Nonfiction. In this influential book Mumford explored the development of urban civilizations. Harshly critical of urban sprawl, Mumford argues that the structure of modern cities is partially responsible for many social problems seen in western society. While pessimistic in tone, Mumford argues that urban planning should emphasize an 'organic' relationship between people and their living spaces. Mumford uses the example of the medieval city as the basis for the "ideal city," and claims that the modern city is too close to the Roman city (the sprawling megalopolis) which ended in collapse; if the modern city carries on in the same vein, Mumford argues, then it will meet the same fate as the Roman city.

Mumford wrote critically of urban culture believing the city is "a product of earth ... a fact of nature ... man's method of expression." Further, Mumford recognized the crises facing urban culture, distrustful of the growing finance industry, political structures, fearful that a local community culture was not being fostered by these institutions. Mumford feared "metropolitan finance," urbanization, politics, and alienation. Mumford wrote: "The physical design of cities and their economic functions are secondary to their relationship to the natural environment and to the spiritual values of human community."

==== Suburbs ====
Suburbia did not escape Mumford's criticism either:

In the suburb one might live and die without marring the image of an innocent world, except when some shadow of evil fell over a column in the newspaper. Thus the suburb served as an asylum for the preservation of illusion. Here domesticity could prosper, oblivious of the pervasive regimentation beyond. This was not merely a child-centered environment; it was based on a childish view of the world, in which reality was sacrificed to the pleasure principle.

=== Religion and spirituality ===
Mumford is also among the first urban planning scholars who paid serious attention to religion in the planning field. In one of his least well-known books, Faith for Living (1940), Mumford argues:

The segregation of the spiritual life from the practical life is a curse that falls impartially upon both sides of our existence.

== Influence ==
Mumford's interest in the history of technology and his explanation of "polytechnics", along with his general philosophical bent, has been an important influence on a number of more recent thinkers concerned that technology serve human beings as broadly and well as possible. Some of these authors—such as Jacques Ellul, Witold Rybczynski, Richard Gregg, Amory Lovins, J. Baldwin, E. F. Schumacher, Herbert Marcuse, Erich Fromm, Murray Bookchin, Thomas Merton, Marshall McLuhan, Colin Ward, and Kevin Carson—have been intellectuals and persons directly involved with technological development and decisions about the use of technology. Mumford also had an influence on the American environmental movement, with thinkers like Barry Commoner and Bookchin being influenced by his ideas on cities, ecology and technology. Ramachandra Guha noted his work contains "some of the earliest and finest thinking on bioregionalism, anti-nuclearism, biodiversity, alternate energy paths, ecological urban planning and appropriate technology." Mumford's influence is also evident in the work of some artists including Berenice Abbott's photographs of New York City in the late 1930s. Mumford was an inspiration for Ellsworth Toohey, the antagonist in Ayn Rand's novel The Fountainhead (1943).

== Works ==
- 1922 The Story of Utopias
- 1924 Sticks and Stones
- 1926 Architecture, published by the American Library Association in its "Reading With a Purpose" series
- 1926 The Golden Day
- 1929 Herman Melville
- 1931 The Brown Decades: A Study of the Arts in America, 1865–1895
- "Renewal of Life" series
  - 1934 Technics and Civilization
  - 1938 The Culture of Cities
  - 1944 The Condition of Man
  - 1951 The Conduct of Life
- 1939 Men Must Act
- 1940 Faith for Living
- 1941 The South in Architecture
- 1945 City Development
- 1946 Values for Survival
- 1952 Art and Technics
- 1952 Roots of Contemporary American Architecture
- 1954 In the Name of Sanity
- 1956 From the Ground Up (essay collection)
- 1956 The Transformations of Man (New York: Harper and Row)
- 1961 The City in History (awarded the National Book Award)
- 1963 The Highway and the City (essay collection)
- The Myth of the Machine (two volumes)
  - 1967 Technics and Human Development
  - 1970 The Pentagon of Power
- 1968 The Urban Prospect (essay collection)
- 1975 Findings and Keepings: Analects for an Autobiography (New York: Harcourt Brace Jovanovich)
- 1979 My Work and Days: A Personal Chronicle
- 1982 Sketches from Life: The Autobiography of Lewis Mumford (New York: Dial Press)
- 1986 The Lewis Mumford Reader (Donald L. Miller, ed.; New York: Pantheon Books)

Films

- 1939 The City

Articles

- "The quick and the dead". The Sky Line. The New Yorker. Vol. 24, no. 46. January 8, 1949. pp. 60–65.
- "Civic virtue". The Sky Line. The New Yorker. Vol. 25, no. 50. February 4, 1950. pp. 58–63.
