= Technics and Civilization =

Book by Lewis Mumford

- First UK edition
- Author: Lewis Mumford
- Language: English
- Genre: Non-fiction
- Publisher: Harcourt, Brace and Company (US); Routledge (UK)
- Media type: Print (Hardback)
- Pages: 495

Technics and Civilization is a 1934 book by American philosopher and historian of technology Lewis Mumford. The book presents the history of technology and its role in shaping and being shaped by civilizations. According to Mumford, modern technology has its roots in the Middle Ages rather than in the Industrial Revolution. It is the moral, economic, and political choices we make, not the machines we use, Mumford argues, that have produced a capitalist industrialized machine-oriented economy, whose imperfect fruits serve the majority so imperfectly.

== Background ==
Apart from its significance as a monumental work of scholarship in several disciplines, Mumford explicitly positioned the book as a call-to-action for the human race to consider its options in the face of the threats to its survival posed by possible ecological catastrophe or industrialised warfare. Technics and Civilization is the first book in Mumford's four-volume Renewal of Life series, followed by The Culture of Cities (1938), The Condition of Man (1944), and The Conduct of Life (1951).

== Synopsis ==
Mumford divides the development of technology into three overlapping phases: eotechnic (Greek, eos meaning "dawn"), paleotechnic and neotechnic.

The first phase of technically civilized life (AD 1000 to 1800) begins with the clock, to Mumford the most important basis for the development of capitalism because time thereby becomes fungible (thus transferable). The clock is the most important prototype for all other machines. He contrasts the development and use of glass, wood, wind and water with the inhumanly horrific work that goes into mining and smelting metal. The use of all of these materials, and the development of science during the eotechnic phase, is based on the abstraction from life of the elements that could be measured. He approves those people, cities and cultures who strove for a harmonious balance between the senses and the freedom from labor provided by science.

"the goal of eotechnic civilization as a whole...was not more power alone but a greater intensification of life: color, perfume, images, music, sexual ecstasy, as well as daring exploits in arms and thought and exploration."

— Lewis Mumford

The second phase, the paleotechnic (roughly 1700 to 1900), is "an upthrust into barbarism, aided by the very forces and interests which originally had been directed toward the conquest of the environment and the perfection of human nature." Inventions of the paleotechnic are made by men trying to solve specific problems rather than hunting for general scientific principles; in fact, scientific learning is devalued by men of business. The invention of coal-fired steam powered factories and the installation of capital-intensive machinery leads to a necessarily gigantic round-the-clock scale of production supported by unskilled machine tenders. Labour becomes a commodity, rather than an inalienable set of skills, while the labourer who tended machines, lived in slums, and was paid starvation wages became physically stunted and socially and spiritually stultified. Mumford notes that the death rate of urban slums compares unfavorably to the agricultural worker of the same time period, and furthermore that life in the nineteenth century compares unfavorably to cleanliness and standards of living available to workers in thirteenth century cities. He also identifies iron as the primary building material of the paleotechnic, and skyscrapers, bridges, and steamships as première accomplishments of the age. War and mass sport he saw as social releases from mechanized life, and the hysteric duties of wartime production (or even the hysteria of a baseball team's victory) is a natural outgrowth of the tensions and structures of such paleotechnic life.

In describing the neotechnic age (from about 1900 to Mumford's present, 1930), he focuses on the invention of electricity, freeing the factory production line from the restrictions of coal through the addition of small electric motors to individual machines, and freeing the laborer to create small but competitive factories. Mumford presciently notes that a small producer can deliver what is needed when it is needed more efficiently than paleotechnic assembly lines. The neotechnic phase he saw was dominated by men of science, rather than mechanically apt machinists. Rather than pursuing accomplishments on the scale of the trains, it is concerned with the invisible, the rare, the atomic level of change and innovation. Compact and lightweight aluminum is the metal of the neotechnic, and communication and information—even inflated amounts—he claimed was the coin.
