= Dead-end street =

Street with only one way in and out

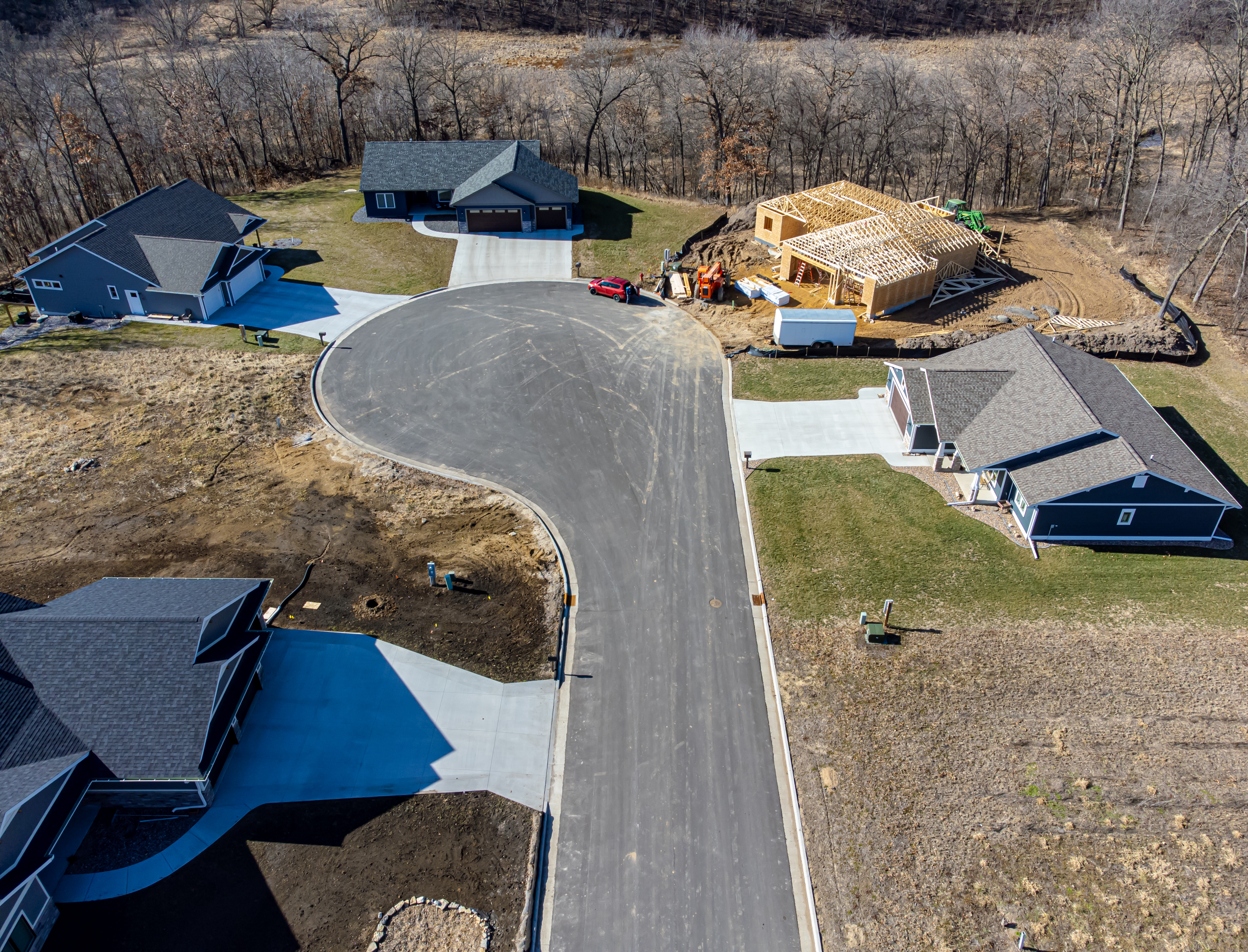
Cul-de-sac in La Crosse, Wisconsin

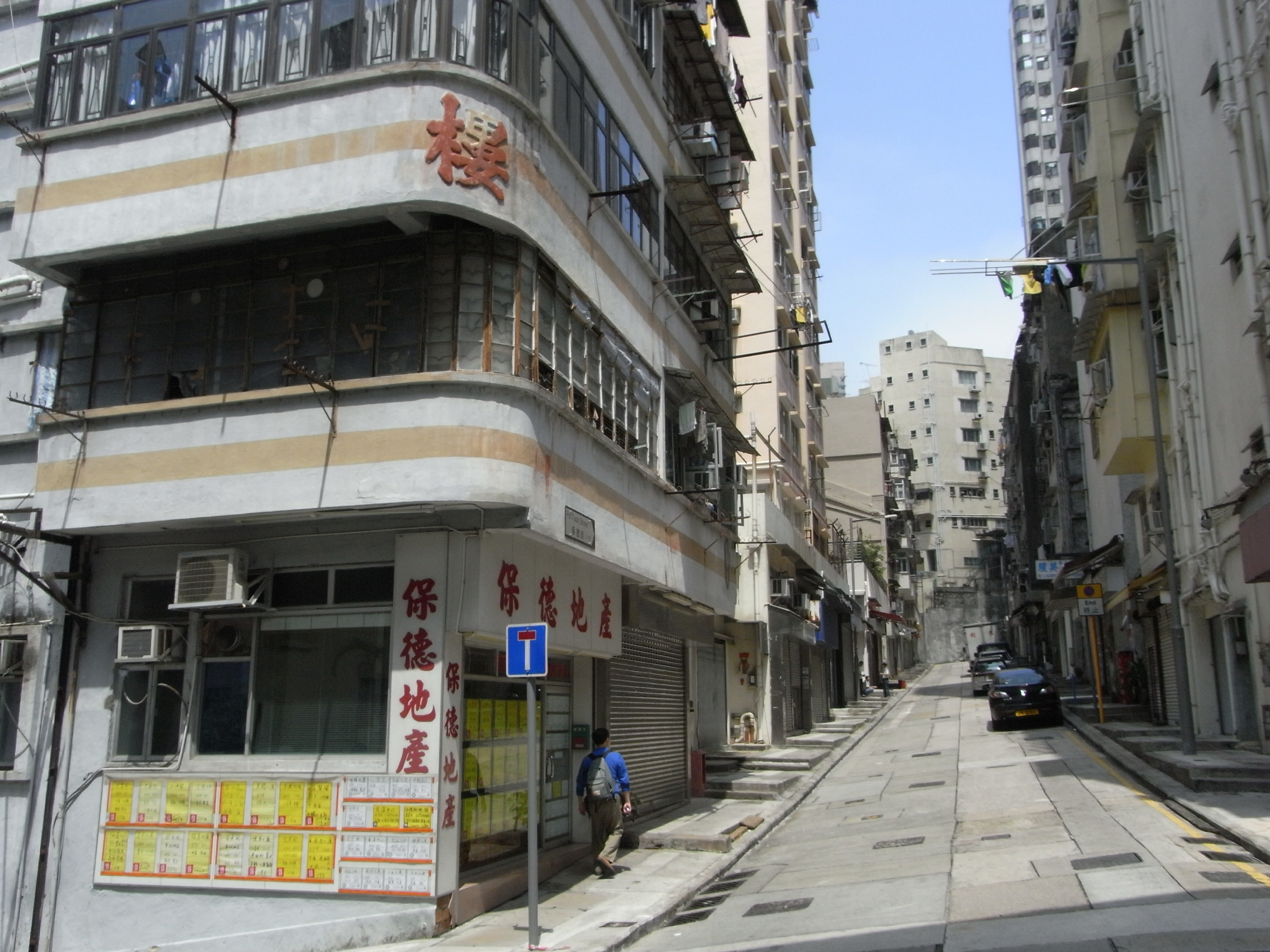
A dead end in Kennedy Town, Hong Kong

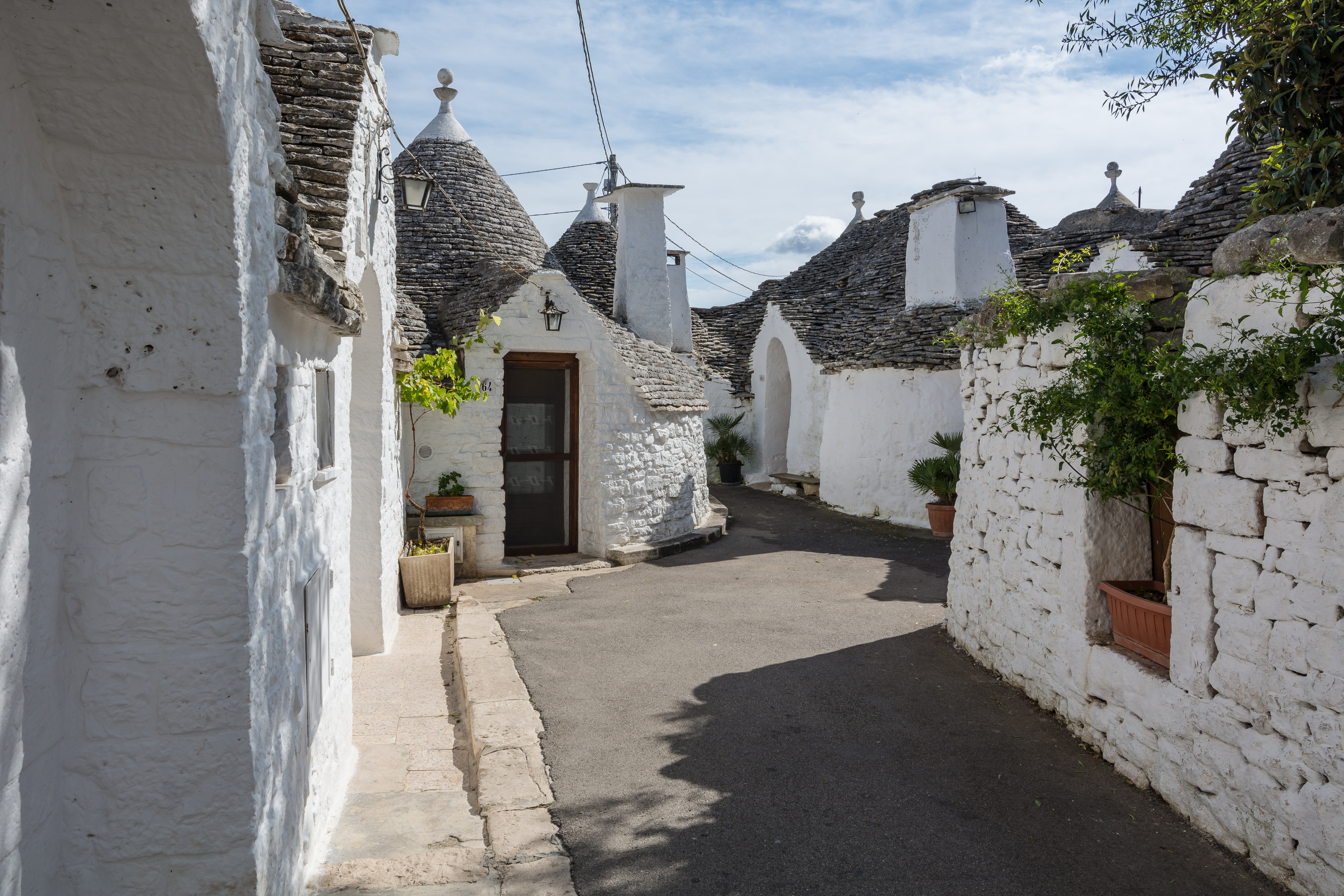
Dead end street in Alberobello, Italy

A dead end, also known as a cul-de-sac (/ˈkʌldəsæk, ˈkʊl-/; French: [kydsak], lit. 'bag bottom'), a no-outlet road, a no-exit road or a no through road, is a street with only one combined inlet and outlet.

Dead ends are added to roads in urban planning designs to limit traffic in residential areas. Some dead ends prohibit all-through traffic, while others allow cyclists, pedestrians, or other non-automotive traffic to pass through connecting easements or paths. The latter case is an example of filtered permeability.

The International Federation of Pedestrians proposed calling such streets "living end streets" and to provide signage at the entry of the streets that clearly indicates non-automotive permeability. This would retain the dead end's primary function as a non-through road, but establish complete pedestrian and bicycle network connectivity.

"Dead end" is not the most commonly used expression in all English-speaking regions. Official terminology and traffic signs include many alternatives; some are only used regionally. In the UK, a dead end residential street is sometimes called a close. In the United States, a cul-de-sac is often not an exact synonym for "dead end," as it refers explicitly to a dead-end street with a circular end, making it easier for vehicles to turn around. Street names are determined at the city or county level, with most choosing to use court for a bulbous cul-de-sac. In Australia, a street with a bulbous end is usually referred to as a court. In Canada, where street names are decided on the municipal level, culs-de-sac are usually named courts.

== History ==
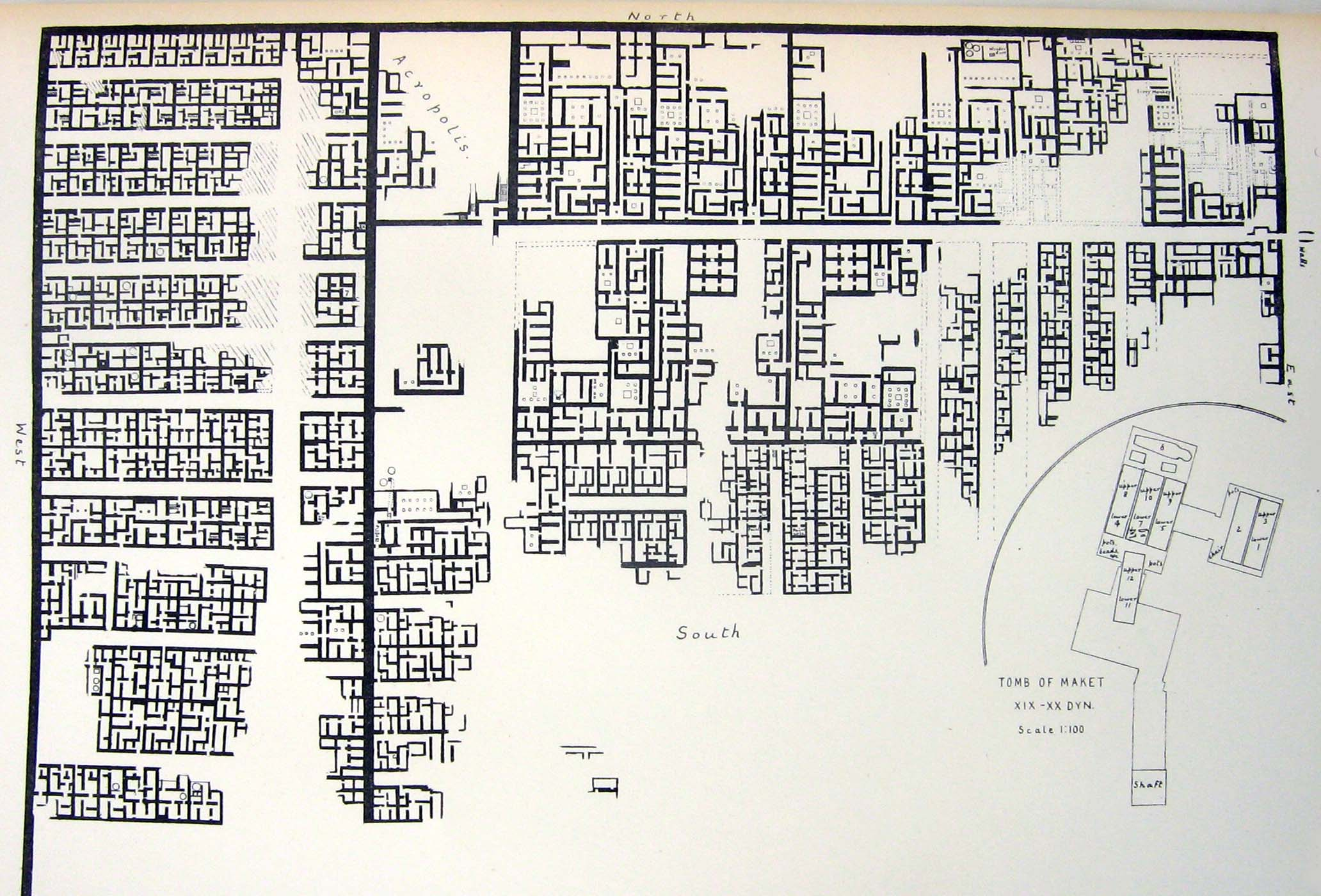
Workers' village at El Lahun pyramid site, Egypt (c. 1885 BC)

The earliest examples of dead ends were unearthed in the El Lahun workers' village in Egypt, which was built in c. 1885 BC. The village was planned and built orthogonally with straight streets that intersect at right angles in an irregular grid. The western section of the excavated village, once home to the workers, featured fifteen narrow, short dead ends arranged perpendicularly on either side of a wider, straight street and ending at the enclosing walls.

Dead end streets also appeared during the classical periods of Athens and Rome. The 15th century architect and planner Leon Battista Alberti implies in his writings that dead end streets may have been used intentionally in antiquity for defense purposes:

The Ancients in All Towns were for having some intricate Ways and turn again Streets [i.e., dead ends or loops], without any Passage through them, that if an Enemy comes into them, he may be at a Loss, and be in Confusion and Suspense; or if he pushes on daringly, may be easily destroyed.

The same opinion is expressed by Aristotle when he criticized the Hippodamian grid:

... but for security in war [the arrangement is more useful if it is planned in] the opposite [manner], as it used to be in ancient times. For that [arrangement] is difficult for foreign troops to enter and find their way about when attacking.

Inferential evidence of their earlier use can also be drawn from the writings of German architect Rudolf Eberstadt, which that explains the purpose of dead-end streets:

We have, in our medieval towns, showing very commendable methods of cutting up the land. I ought to mention here that to keep traffic out of residential streets is necessary not only in the general interest of the population, but, above all, for the sake of the children, whose health (amongst the working classes) is mainly dependent on the opportunity of moving about in close connection with their dwelling places, without the danger of being run over. In the earlier periods, traffic was excluded from residential streets simply by gates or by employing the cul-de-sac.

It was in the United Kingdom that the cul-de-sac street type was first legislated into use, with the Hampstead Garden Suburb Act 1906 (6 Edw. 7. c. cxcii). The proponents of the act, Raymond Unwin and Barry Parker, thus gained permission to introduce culs-de-sac in their subsequent site plans, and they promoted it as a suitable street type for garden suburbs. Unwin's applications of the cul-de-sac and the related crescent always included pedestrian paths independent of the road network. This design feature reflects the predominance of pedestrian movement for local trips at the turn of the 20th century, and presages the current planning priority for increased pedestrian accessibility. The Hampstead Garden Suburb Act 1906 defined the nature of the cul-de-sac as a non-through road and restricted its length to 500 feet (150 m). Garden cities in the UK that followed Hampstead, such as Welwyn Garden City, all included culs-de-sac.

In the 1920s, the garden city movement became more popular in the United States and, with it, came its design elements, such as the cul-de-sac. Clarence Stein, a main proponent of the movement, incorporated it in the Radburn, New Jersey (1929) subdivision, which was to become a model for subsequent neighborhood developments. The first modern cul-de-sac (1922) in America might be found in Buffalo, New York.

The country's Federal Housing Authority (FHA) recommended and promoted their use through their 1936 guidelines and the power of lending development funds.

In Canada, a variation of Stein's Radburn 1929 plan that used crescents (loops) instead of culs-de-sac was built in 1947: Wildwood Park, Winnipeg, designed by Hubert Bird. In 1954, the Central Mortgage and Housing Corporation published its own guidelines in which the cul-de-sac was strongly recommended for local streets and, as the FHA in the US, used its lending power to see its inclusion in development plans. Varsity Village and Braeside, subdivisions in Calgary, Alberta, also used the Radburn model in the late 1960s.

In the 1960s the cul-de-sac attained systematic international application in planned new cities such as Doxiadis' Islamabad (1960). In the UK, new towns such as Harlow (1947) by Sir Frederick Gibberd and Milton Keynes (1967) incorporated culs-de-sac and crescents in their layouts.

Planning theorists have suggested the use of alternatives to culs-de-sac. Most notably, Christopher Alexander et al., in his 1977 book "A Pattern Language" (pattern #49) suggests the use of looped local roads which do not abruptly stop. Although dead end streets would fit his definition of looped local roads, Alexander suggestions that "cul-de-sacs [sic] are very bad from a social standpoint—they force interaction and they feel claustrophobic, because there is only one entrance". Doxiadis has additionally argued their important role in separating man from machine.

=== Originally-unplanned dead ends ===
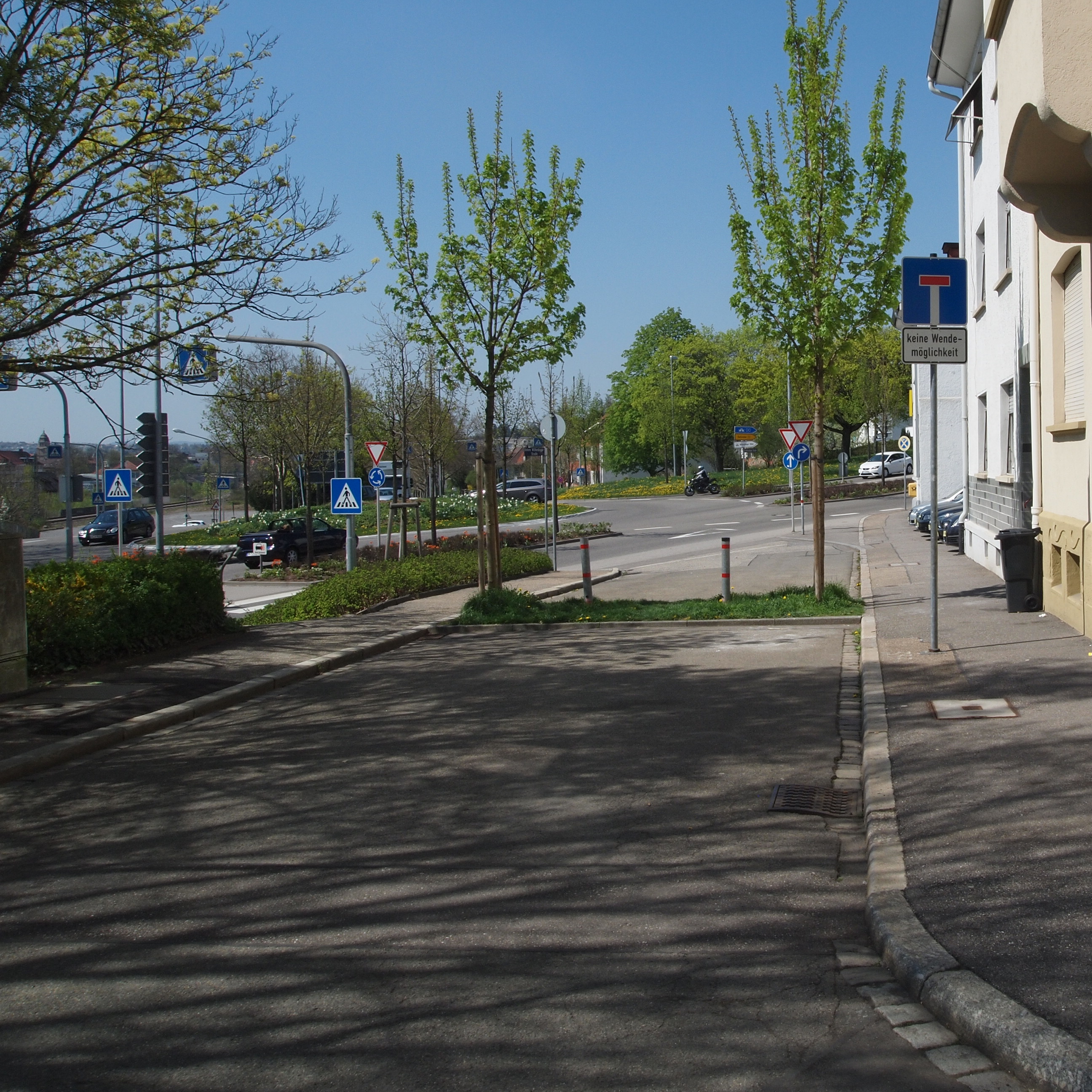
Two dead ends, made by closing a minor road in the center to block through-traffic

Originally unplanned dead ends have been added in city centers that are laid out on a grid by blocking through-traffic. Whole neighbourhood street reconfigurations emerged in several cities, mainly concentrated in North America and the UK, which include Berkeley, California; Seattle, Washington; and Vancouver, British Columbia. The transformation of grid plans since the 1970s limits access to an existing road that is newly designated as a major artery, enabling traffic to move smoothly on it, alleviating residents' concerns.

This selective, sporadic transformation has been continuing into the 21st century. City planners sometimes, as traffic volumes increase and as cities decide to remove or reduce traffic on specific streets of central areas, streets are closed off using bollards or landscaping. As such, these actions make new, originally unplanned dead ends and producing a new, functional blend of the inherited grid with newer street types. A common variation of limiting traffic is managed via closure of retractable bollards that are activated only by designated card-holders.

== Suburban use and benefits ==
Since the end of World War II, new subdivisions in the United States and Canada, as well as New Towns in England and other countries have made extensive use of the cul-de-sac and crescent (loops) street types. Typically, there is one or several central roads in the subdivision with many cul-de-sac streets of varying length, branching out from the main roads, to fill the land in the subdivision, a dendrite or hierarchical pattern. Since the 1960s, the pattern has been the dominant road network structure of suburbs and exurbs in the United States, Canada, and Australia. It is also increasingly popular in Latin America, Western Europe, and China. In this pattern, there are only a few roads (relative to the number of cul-de-sac streets) leading out of the subdivision and into other subdivisions or onto major roads.

In the US, these changes can be attributed to real-estate developers' desire to meet FHA guidelines and make federal home loans available to their customers. In Canada, a similar incentive was provided to developers by CMHC. The incentives, which were discontinued in the 1970s, gave the initial impetus for the application of the hierarchical pattern. In other countries, such incentives do not exist, and adoption is motivated by customer preferences.

American urban planning, in the 19th and the early 20th centuries, emphasized a grid plan, partly out of extensive reliance on foot, horse, and trams for transportation. In such earlier urban development, alleys were included to allow for deliveries of soiled supplies, such as coal, to the rear of houses, which are now heated by electricity, piped natural gas or oil.

=== Effects on local traffic ===
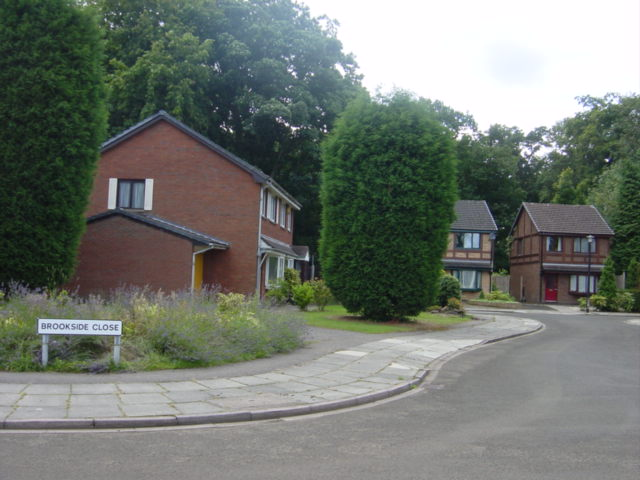
The Channel 4 soap opera Brookside was filmed exclusively in Brookside Close in Liverpool.

The use of culs-de-sac has been shown to reduce the volume of car traffic on residential streets within a subdivision which in turn can reduce noise, air pollution, and the probability of accidents.

Ben-Joseph (1995) and Lovegrove and Sayed (2006) indicate a substantially lower collision rate for street networks based on the cul-de-sac street type. Dumbaugh and Rae (2009) suggest that land-use patterns play a significant role in traffic safety and should be considered in conjunction with the network pattern. While all intersection types in general increase the incidence of fatal crashes, four-way intersections, which rarely occur in a network with cul-de-sac or loop streets, increase total and injurious crashes significantly. This study recommends hybrid street networks with dense concentrations of T-intersections, and concludes that a return to the 19th century gridiron is undesirable.

In turn, the decrease in traffic is thought to lower the incidence of crime and increase desirability, because in most cases the people who traverse the cul-de-sac either live there or are guests of those who do. CPTED planning principles suggest increased natural surveillance and sense of ownership as a means of fostering security in a neighborhood. Both of these phenomena occur naturally on a cul-de-sac street as does social networking. Design guidelines based on the CPTED perspective recommend its use for those reasons.

Cul-de-sac streets increase spontaneous outdoor activity by children. A study in California examined the amount of child play that occurred on the streets of neighbourhoods with different characteristics; grid pattern and culs-de-sac. The findings indicate that culs-de-sac showed substantial increase in play activity than the open grid street pattern. Culs-de-sac reduce perceived danger from traffic, thereby encouraging more outdoor play.

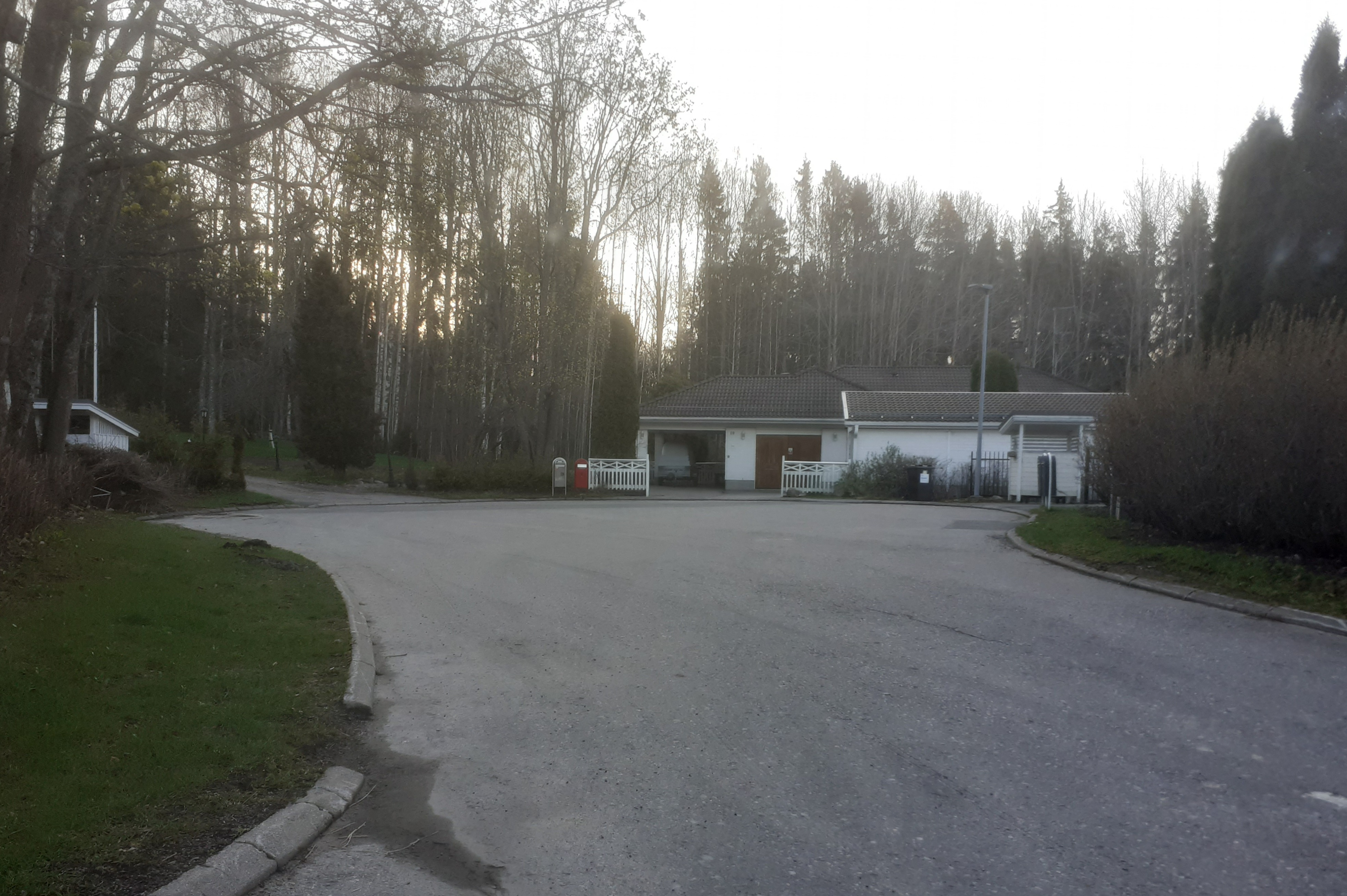
Cul-de-sac in Vantaa, Finland

Similar studies in Europe and Australia found that children's outdoor play is significantly reduced on through roads where traffic is, or perceived by parents to be, a risk. In addition, they confirmed the results of the seminal Donald Appleyard 1982 study, which showed the negative correlation between amount of traffic and social networks. The inverse correlation between amounts of traffic and sociability of streets was reconfirmed by a newer study that repeated Appleyard's San Francisco analysis in Bristol, UK. It showed that the cul-de-sac street with the lowest traffic of the three streets had the highest level of social interaction.

The studies recommend the use of the cul-de-sac or strong traffic calming measures. When culs-de-sac are interconnected with foot and bike paths, as for example in Vauban, Freiburg and Village Homes in Davis, California, they can increase active modes of mobility among their residents.

=== Real estate desirability ===
Real estate developers prefer culs-de-sac because they allow builders to fit more houses into oddly shaped tracts of land and facilitate building to the edges of rivers and property lines. They also choose these discontinuous network patterns of cul-de-sac and loop streets because of they offer significant savings in infrastructure costs compared to the grid plan.

From an environmental perspective, culs-de-sac allow greater flexibility than the common grid in adapting to the natural grades of a site and to its ecologically sensitive features, such as streams, creeks, and mature forest growth.

The desirability of the cul-de-sac street type among home buyers is implied by the evidence that they often pay up to a 20% premium for a home on such a street, according to one study. That could be because there is considerably less passing traffic, resulting in less noise and reduced actual or perceived risk, increasing the sense of tranquility. A survey of residents on three types of streets: cul-de-sac, loop, and through (grid) recorded their preferences among these types. It found that 82% of cul-de-sac residents preferred their own street type, 18% preferred a loop, and 0% the grid. Only 13% of grid street residents preferred their own type and 54% would choose a cul-de-sac. Two other studies, reported in 1990 and 2009 respectively, confirmed the upward trend and determined the premium that cul-de-sac streets command. The first found a 29% premium over the streets in a grid. The second, focused on trails and greenbelts, found that other amenities including cul-de-sac streets add significantly to the home value.

The positive feelings that a cul-de-sac street could evoke, that residents value, are expressed vividly by Allan Jacobs in describing Roslyn Place, a short (250 ft [76 m]), narrow (60 ft [18 m]), densely built (14 du per acre [35 per hectare]), and wood-paved cul-de-sac in the Shadyside neighborhood of Pittsburgh, Pennsylvania: "Step into Roslyn Place and you are likely to sense, immediately, that you are in a place, a special place, a handsome place, a safe place, a welcoming place, a place where you might wish to live." "narrowness and enclosure and intimacy bring a feeling of safety to Roslyn Place... 'Stay on our street' is all the kids have to know".

Gated communities, whose numbers are steadily increasing worldwide, use cul-de-sac and loop street networks because the dendrite structure reduces the number of through roads and thus the corresponding number of entries and exits that need to be controlled.

== Criticisms and discussion ==
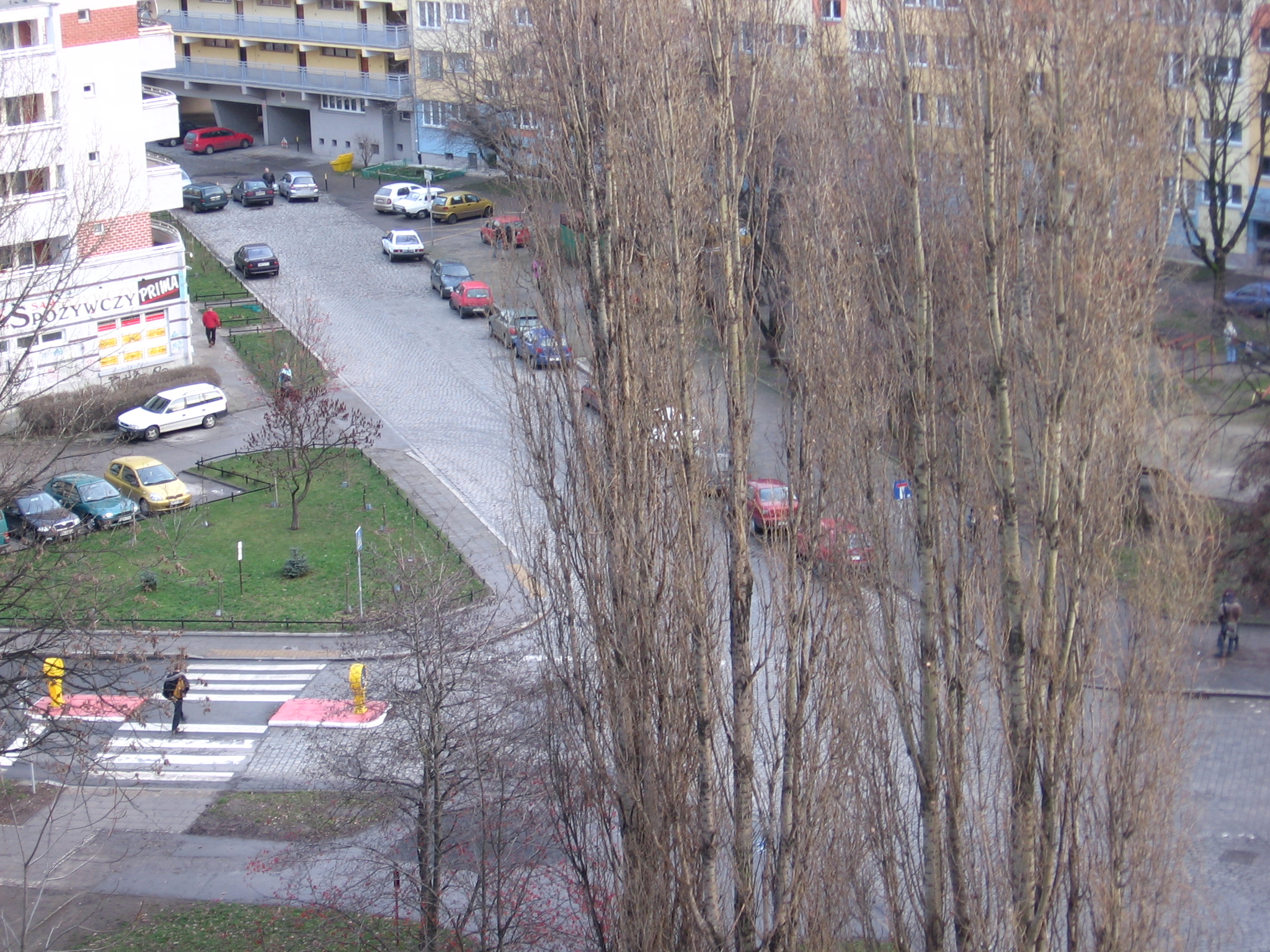
A cul-de-sac in Wrocław, Poland

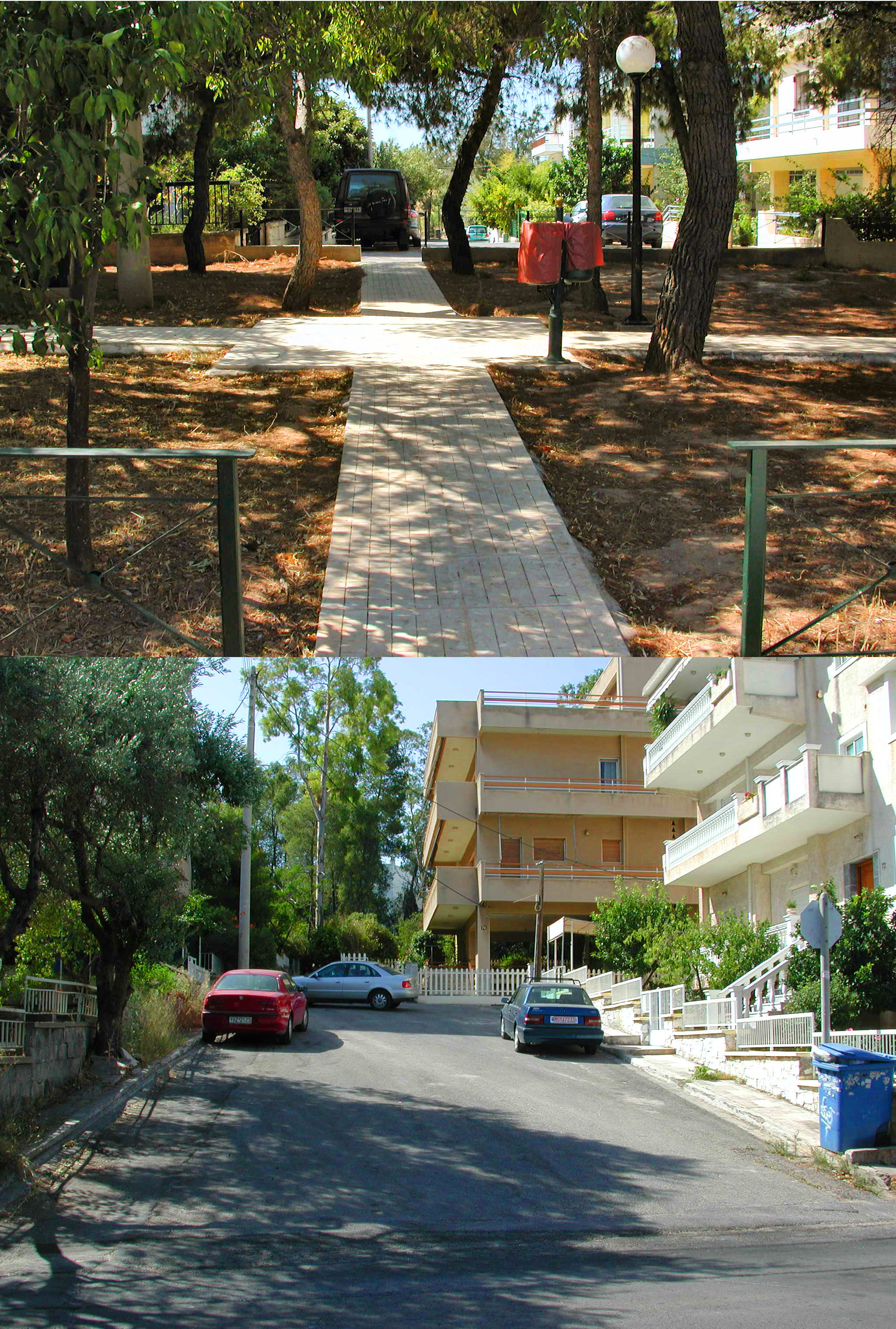
One of several short, narrow, connected cul-de-sac streets in Athens, Greece. The photos show the street (below) and the connecting footpath to the corresponding street (above).

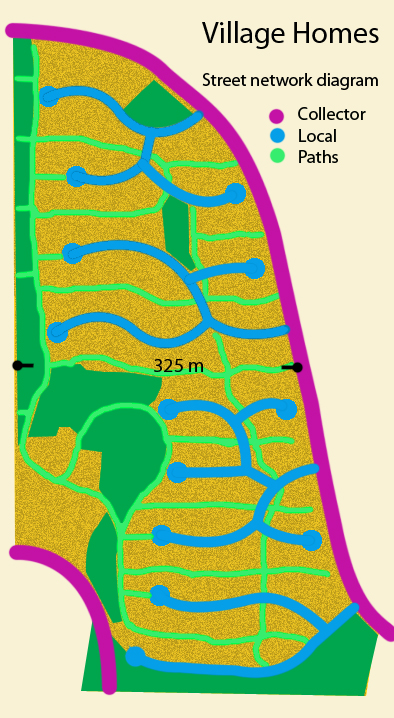
A plan of Village Homes in Davis, California, showing the street and path network with connected culs-de-sac

=== Traffic safety ===
Dead ends are traditionally considered safer traffic environments for children than normal streets, but research shows that areas with many dead ends in fact have higher rates of traffic accidents involving young children.

This increased risk of death is due to multiple factors, including:

- families living on dead end streets drive longer distances to reach their destinations,
- parents living on dead end streets spend less time teaching their children to be as wary of traffic, and
- an increased risk of the parents accidentally driving over the children in front of their own homes.

=== Environmental effects ===
Culs-de-sac are criticised by urban designers like those of the Foundation for the Built Environment in the UK for encouraging car transport for even short distances, as more direct connections are precluded by the geometry, which necessitates long travel distances even to physically-nearby locations. This increases fuel consumption and vehicle emissions and has negative effects on health by reducing walking and cycling rates. Related research in the United States by Richard Jackson has shown that people in car-based (cul-de-sac heavy) communities weigh on average 6 pounds (2.7 kg) more than those in traditional towns (with open grid networks).

=== Health effects ===
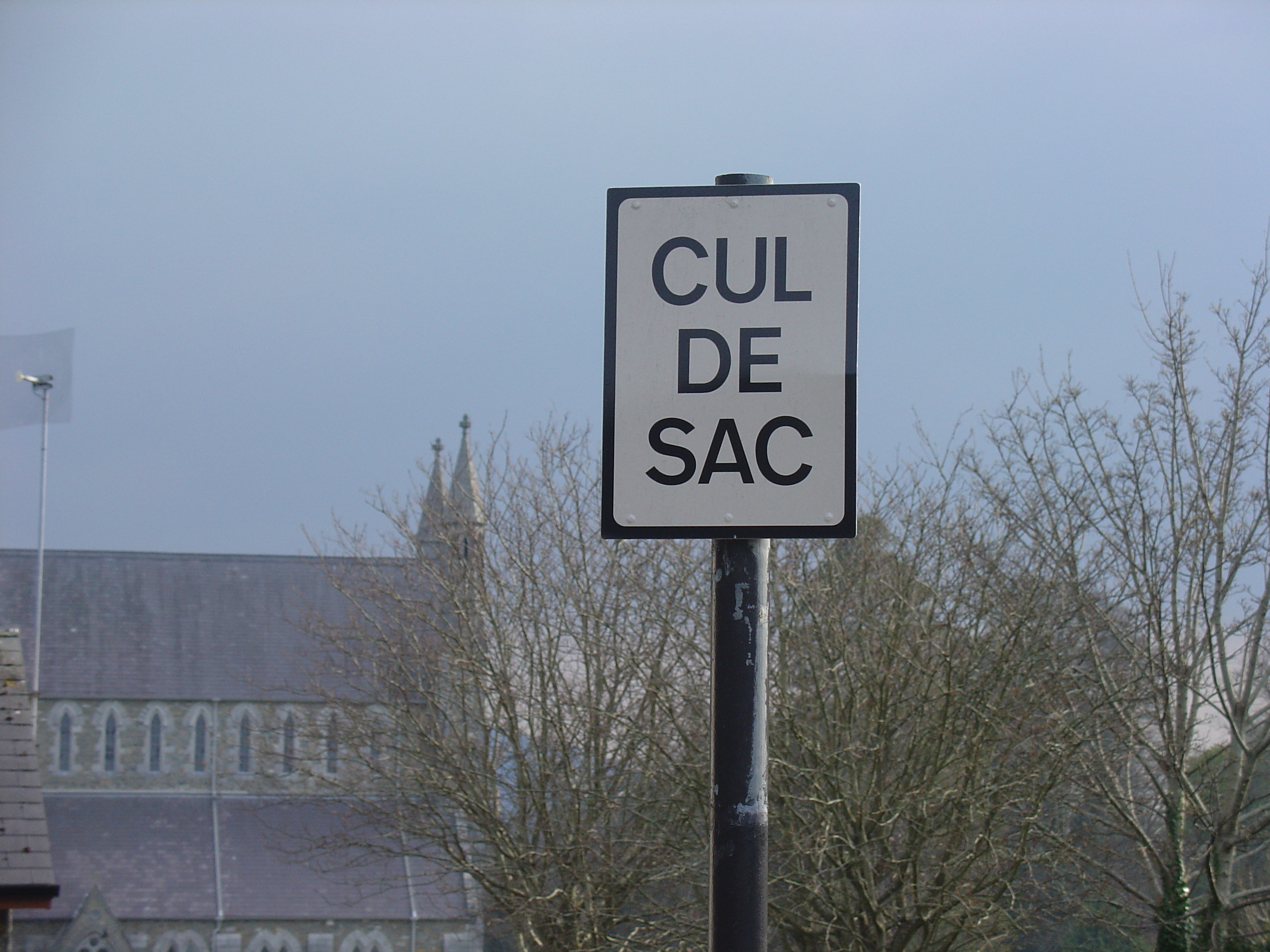
A cul-de-sac sign in Dublin, Ireland

An extensive analysis of the research evidence by TRB, however, shows only an association between the built environment and physical activity levels, not causal connections. The evidence also does not identify with certainty which characteristics of the built environment are most closely associated with physical activity behaviour. The study also warns against confusing inadequate physical activity with obesity which is the outcome of an energy imbalance. Many contemporary lifestyle trends, some inevitable (sedentary work) and some avoidable (frequent energy-rich food consumption or the watching of television [four hours per day]), contribute to the imbalance and must be considered in understanding and combating obesity.

The impermeability deficiency of the typical cul-de-sac street can be addressed by applying a modified, improved version of it, mentioned above, that enables pedestrian and bicycle through-movement. While this more permeable version can be applied in new developments easily, modifying existing impermeable cul-de-sac streets is problematic as it encounters property ownership issues. Efforts in that direction are, however, being made. Because of the complicated legal process and the sheer number of existing cul-de-sac streets, however, such efforts would be slow to produce results and may have little impact in changing the landscape of existing districts.

Conversely, transforming existing streets that are part of a grid plan into permeable, linked culs-de-sac, as was done in Berkeley, California, and Vancouver, British Columbia, is physically and administratively easy due to the public ownership of the street right-of-way. However, residents on adjacent through roads may resent the potential traffic increase and delay the process. In Berkeley, the barriers used were permeable to both pedestrian and bicycle traffic and became a critical feature of the bicycle boulevard system in that region.

Increases in pedestrian and bicycle permeability may result in a displacement of local car trips for short-distance destinations, and consequently a reduction in neighbourhood vehicle emissions. The impermeable cul-de-sac not only discourages walking and biking but also increases the length of car trips by the circuitous geometry of the dendrite network structure of which it is a part.

Research studies examined the influence of several variables on the amount of car travel that residents of several types of districts recorded. Results vary considerably among them, but there is general agreement on a number of key correlations: a) the wealthier and the larger the family is, the more cars they own, and the more they drive, b) the farther away a family lives from the city centre, and the fewer the jobs in the vicinity, plus a slow bus service, the more they drive, and c) street patterns may add a 10% length to local trips, but the total VKTs are affected more by the "macro" urban than the "micro" neighbourhood structure.

=== Safety and crime ===
Culs-de-sac, especially those that also limit pedestrian routes instead of only road-traffic routes, have also been criticised for negative effects on safety because they decrease the amount of through-traffic (vehicular or pedestrian) that might notice an accident or crime victim in need of help. Proponents of culs-de-sac and gated communities have in turn countered that the reduction in through-traffic makes any "stranger" much more recognisable in the closed local environment and thus reduces crime danger. That view has in turn been characterized as unrealistic. It is argued that, since only very few of all non-locals passing through the area are potential criminals, increased traffic should increase rather than decrease safety.

Research has expanded the discussion on the disputed issue. A 2008 study did extensive spatial analysis and correlated several building, site plan and social factors with crime frequencies and identified subtle nuances to the contrasting positions. The study looked at, among others, a) dwelling types, b) unit density (site density) c) movement on the street, d) culs-de-sac or grids, and e) the permeability of a residential area. Among its conclusions are, respectively, that a) flats are always safer than houses and the wealth of inhabitants matters, b) density is generally beneficial but more so at ground level, c) local movement is beneficial but larger-scale movement not so, d) relative affluence and the number of neighbours has a greater effect than either being on a cul-de-sac or being on a through-street. It also established again that simple, linear culs-de-sac with good numbers of dwellings that are joined to through streets tend to be safe. As for permeability, it suggests that residential areas should be permeable enough to allow movement in all directions but no more. The overprovision of poorly used permeability is a crime hazard.

=== Isolation and connection ===
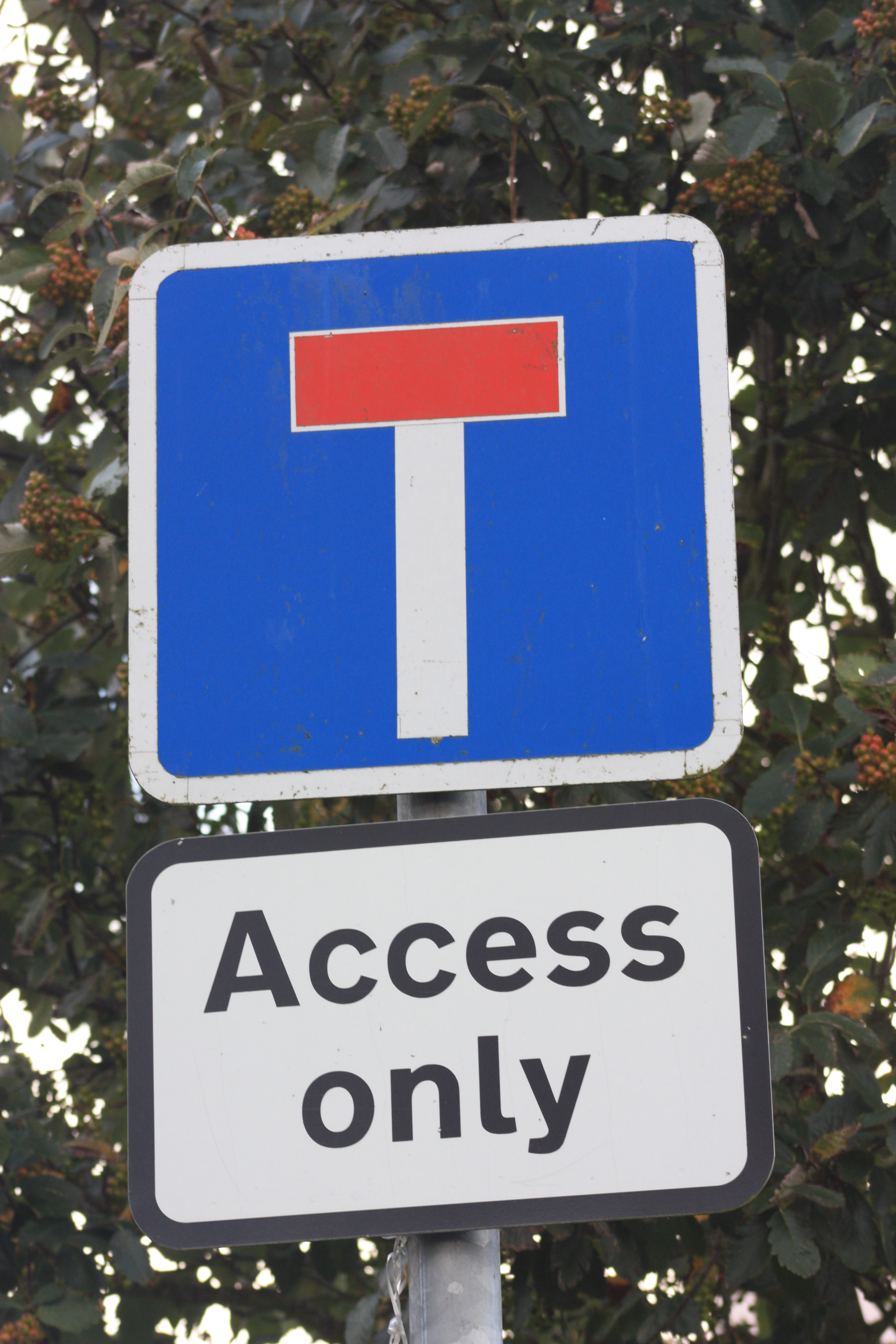
A cul-de-sac sign in Strangford, Northern Ireland

More generally, the New Urbanism movement has offered criticism of the cul-de-sac and crescent (loop) street types not intended to network with each other. It has been suggested that such street layouts can cause increased traffic on the collector streets. It is recognized that culs-de-sac and looped streets inherently remove car traffic through them and restrict access to residents only. Resident traffic is naturally channelled to minor residential collectors and to arterials that provide inter-neighbourhood and inter-district connectivity.

A study, reported in 1990, compared the traffic performance in a 700-acre (2.8 km^{2}; 280 ha) development that was laid out using two approaches, one with and the other without hierarchy or cul-de-sac streets. It concluded that the non-hierarchical, traditional layout generally shows lower peak speed and shorter, more frequent intersection delays than the hierarchical pattern. The traditional pattern is not as conducive to long trips as the hierarchical but more conducive to short trips. Local trips in it are shorter in distance but about equivalent in time with the hierarchical layout. A later similar comparative traffic study of about 830 acres (3.4 km^{2}; 340 ha) concluded that all types of layouts perform adequately in most land-use scenarios and that a refined hierarchical, dendrite network can improve traffic performance.

Anecdotal and research evidence suggests that navigation (especially on foot) in a disconnected network of cul-de-sac and looped streets is inconvenient and non-intuitive, particularly when combined with curvilinear geometry. Loss of orientation and sense of direction is also a common experience in older cities with cul-de-sac streets (Medina of Arab cities or Mediterranean hill towns) as well as in cities with highly-irregular block geometries and sizes and corresponding street alignments that produce a labyrinthine effect. The long history of such cities implies that an irregular, complicated street network that appears entirely illegible to a visitor is well understood and used by the inhabitants. More convincing about its workability for their permanent residents are the case histories of cities such as Regensburg that show a gradual transformation of an imported or imposed orthogonal, "legible" grid to the traditional "confusing" street networks.

Cul-de-sac and loop streets can reduce the size of any given neighbourhood to a single street. Neighbourhoods can be defined by geographic boundaries but more often it is shared ethnic, socioeconomic and cultural characteristics that produce social cohesion irrespective of apparent physical "boundaries". Mehaffy et al. (2010), who propose a model for structuring an urban network, suggest that neighbourhoods cannot be designed into being. "Community" is viewed as a dynamic social and cultural construct, especially in contemporary, open, multicultural cities. Residential area street configuration can assist its emergence only by reducing through-traffic and increasing local pedestrian movement – a design goal for which connected cul-de-sac and looped streets are suited.

Issues of pedestrian trip length and isolation are very evident in the back-to-front housing arrangement where the front of the house fronts onto the cul-de-sac street while the rear fronts onto the main roads. Some of the problems can be mitigated by the newer practice of connecting the neighbouring roads and culs-de-sac with public pedestrian or cycle paths. In effect, this removes the discontinuity aspect for these modes of transport. Built examples of such connected culs-de-sac can be found in the United States (such as Radburn, New Jersey, and Village Homes, California), England (such as Milton Keynes), and Greece (such as Papagou, a suburb of Athens). Acknowledging their use, Germany, under the 2009 amendment to the Road Traffic Act, introduced an additional sign for culs-de-sac that are permeable to pedestrians and cyclists (see under signage below). A new system for organizing connected, permeable culs-de-sac into complete neighbourhoods, the fused grid, has been developed by Canada Mortgage and Housing Corporation.

=== Density ===
A cul-de-sac sign used in Texas, United States

In the development context and planning literature of North America, culs-de-sac have been associated with low-density residential development. Sustainable development theorists and proponents claim that to be, in some undefined way, inefficient. The increased prevalence of cul-de-sac streets occurred in the 1960s and 1970s, a period of rapid economic and city expansion, when a detached house on a large lot meant an ideal form of habitation. The temporal coincidence of the wide adoption of a street type and an increasing demand for large lots and houses suggests a necessary relationship between street type and unit density.

Historically, however, the earliest systematic application of the cul-de-sac street type by Raymond Unwin (1909) had a unit density between 8 and 12 units per acre (20 and 30 per hectare), considerably higher than mid-to-late 20th century. Even in the 21st century, developments rarely achieve densities above 5 to 7 units per acre (12 to 17 per hectare) in the suburbs. Conversely, early 1950s suburban developments that were laid out on a grid exhibit similar low densities. Evidently, street, network type and density are not linked causally; other factors, such as land scarcity and income, influence the outcome as, for example, in cities that are landlocked or that have low average incomes.

=== Accessibility of services ===
Another concern is often voiced by emergency services, which can have difficulty locating streets when a community consists of a large number of similarly named culs-de-sac; also, large fire response vehicles, in particular, can have great difficulty with turning around in a cul-de-sac. However, confusing street naming is not a necessary outcome of street network design and can be improved. The practice of naming orthogonal networks by numbers and letters in the corresponding cardinal directions has been criticized by Camilo Sitte as lacking imagination. Nonetheless, police and fire departments now use advanced GPS systems that quickly locate the destination and the shortest path to follow.

School buses can also have a hard time turning around, which means that children who live in a cul-de-sac must often walk to a bus stop on a main through-road. However, research on obesity and urban planning suggests that to be a possible advantage because it enables children to get daily physical activity. Longer walking distances, however, reduce interest in using buses especially when a car is available. This disincentive to walking to a school bus-stop can be overcome in planned cul-de-sac streets by regulating their maximum length to about 500 ft (150 m), as was recommended and practiced by R. Unwin and others.

=== Regulation ===
Weighing available evidence has led a few US cities including Austin, Texas; Charlotte, North Carolina; and Portland, Oregon, to restrict and regulate the inclusion of cul-de-sac streets in new suburbs. However, a 2010 study on sprawl in North America by a legal expert concludes that "neighborhoods dominated by culs-de-sac are less walkable than those that include street grids. On the other hand, culs-de-sac do have a countervailing public benefit: because of their very inaccessibility, they tend to have less automobile traffic.

Given the existence of important public policy goals on both sides, a city seeking to maximize walkability should not favor culs-de-sac over grids, but should also allow some culs-de-sac as a legitimate residential option. In addition, there are "middle ground" alternatives between prohibiting culs-de-sac and mandating them. For example, a city could encourage culs-de-sac combined with pedestrian walkways." This design combination is shown in the Village Homes layout and is an integral part of the Fused Grid.

== Terminology ==
The expression cul-de-sac comes from French, where it originally meant "bottom of a sack". It was first used in English in anatomy (since 1738). It was used for dead end streets since 1800 in English (since the 14th century in French). The often-heard erroneous folk etymology "arse/ass [buttocks] of the sack" is based on the modern meaning of cul in French, Catalan, and Occitan, but cul does not have that meaning in cul-de-sac, which is still used to refer to dead ends in modern French – although the terms impasse and voie sans issue are more common.

George Orwell wrote in his 1946 article "Politics and the English Language" that the term "cul de sac" is another foreign word used in English as pretentious diction and is unnecessary.

J. R. R. Tolkien used the name Bag End as a translation of "cul-de-sac" to poke fun at the British use of French terms.

The French term "cul-de-sac" and English synonyms or near-synonyms "dead end" and "no exit" have inspired metaphorical uses in literature and in culture, often with the result that a word or phrase seeming to have a negative connotation is replaced in street signs with a new coinage ("no outlet" is another alternative name used on street signs).

=== Australia ===
In Australia, dead end streets are signposted as and often referred to as a "no-through road". Suffixes for these types of streets include "court", "close" or "place". The term "cul-de-sac" generally only refers to a reasonably short street with a bulbous end, or even only to the end portion. A long road that is a no-through road and terminates abruptly is usually called a dead end. In older suburbs, dead-end streets are sometimes suffixed as 'crescent' or 'avenue' on street signs.

=== Canada ===
In Canada, "cul-de-sac" is commonly used in speech but "no-exit" or "no-through road" is more common in road signs, especially in western Canada. In Quebec and Newfoundland, "cul-de-Sac" is in far more common use, although Quebec uses "impasse" too.

=== Italy ===
In Italy, terms commonly used in speech for dead-end street include strada senza uscita ("dead end road") and "cul-de-sac". Metaphorically, in Italy, the expression "cul-de-sac" is used to indicate an inextricable stalemate.

=== New Zealand ===
In New Zealand, dead end streets are sometimes signposted as "No Exit", but are often not signposted at all. The terms 'cul-de-sac' and 'dead end' have the same senses as in Australia. Similarly to Australia, residential culs-de-sac with bulbous ends are often suffixed with "Place", abbreviated to "Pl" on street signs.

=== United Kingdom ===
In British English, the phrase "close" is often used as a suffix for residential cul-de-sac roads, although several variants exist similar to those used in other Commonwealth countries.

=== United States ===
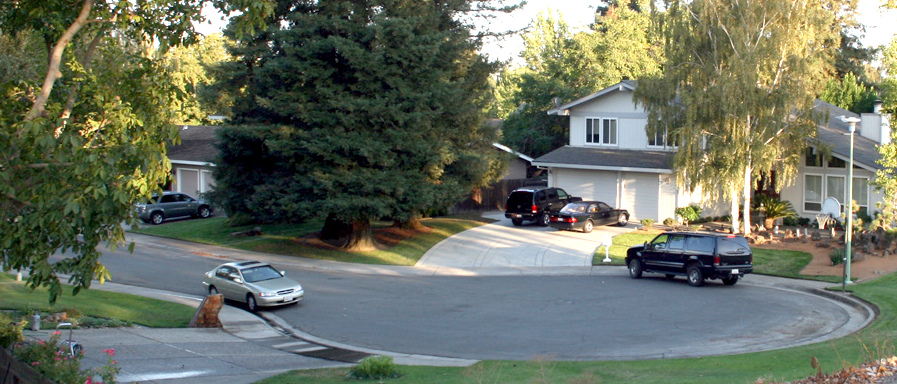
A cul-de-sac in Sacramento, California

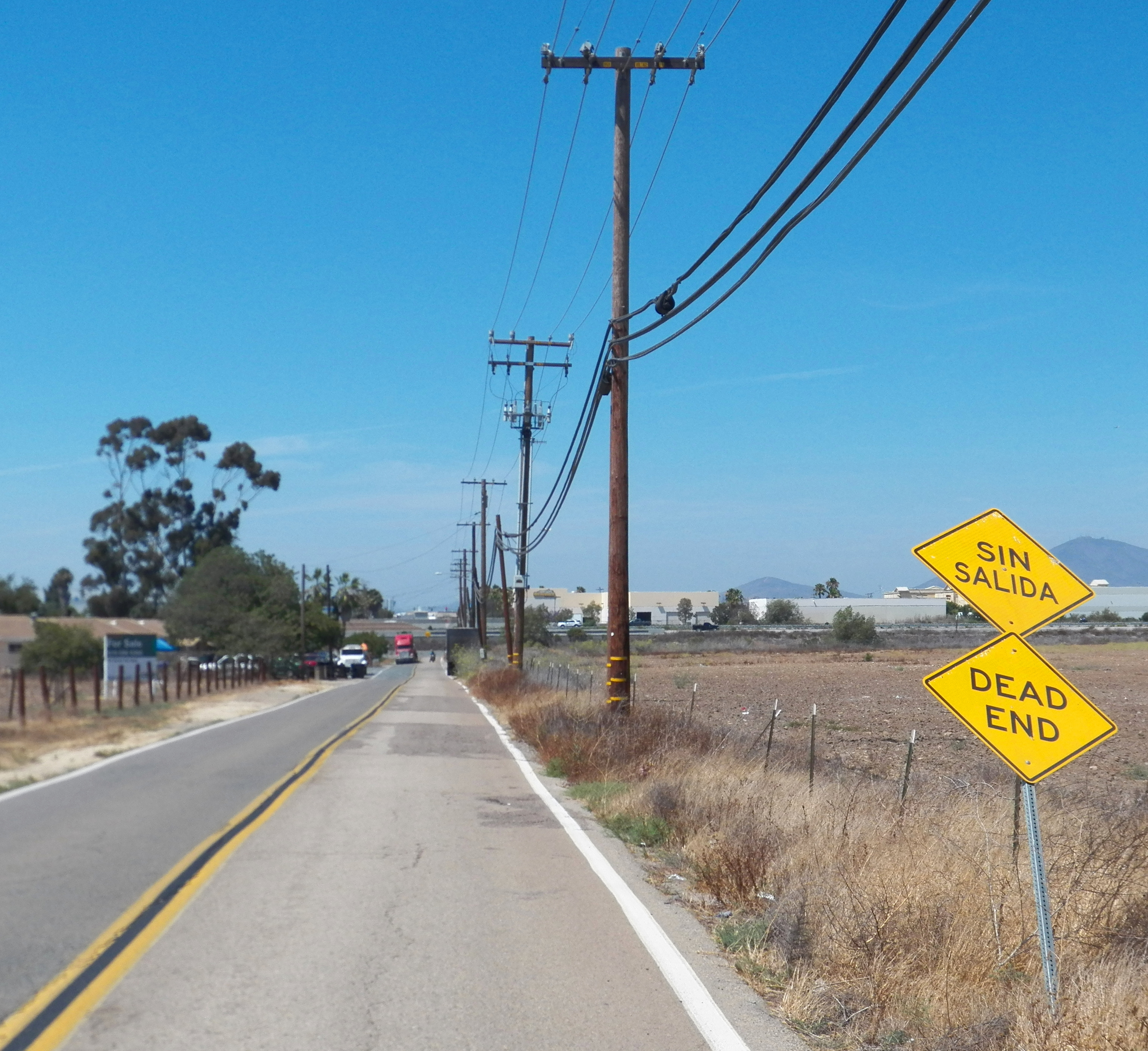
Dead end sign in English and Spanish in Otay Mesa, San Diego

US Federal Highway Administration rules state: "The Dead End sign may be used at the entrance of a single road or street that terminates in a dead end or cul-de-sac. The No Outlet sign may be used at the entrance to a road or road network from which there is no other exit." There is no federal regulation on "no exit".

The phrase "No Exit" is also preferred for Chicago signs, although "dead end" is still used there. New York City has favored "dead end" since at least the 1930s, when Sidney Kingsley used the phrase to title his Broadway play about poor, tough East Side youths with lives of little promise, in contrast to the dead end streets of the nearby Sutton Place neighborhood. (Similarly, French existentialist Jean-Paul Sartre titled a play about three damned sinners, Huis Clos, translated into English as "No Exit".) Kingsley's play was later made into a movie, Dead End, which proved so popular that it spawned similar movies, many starring a group of recurring characters known as the Dead End Kids. The play and movies produced such a strong image of bleak futures and an unfair society that some municipalities changed the sign terminology for culs-de-sac, often to "no outlet" or "no exit". (The "dead end" signs currently at Sutton Place are bright yellow with black lettering.)

In New York City, as of 2008, there were 4,659 "dead end" traffic signs, along with 160 "no outlet" signs. The city records, which go back to the 1960s, show only a couple of "no exit" signs once existing near the approaches to the Midtown Tunnel, and which are no longer there. New York City Commissioner of Transportation Janette Sadik-Khan said in 2008: "We hear that some towns use 'no outlet' instead of 'dead end' because they think it sounds less morbid." "We tell New Yorkers the truth: it's a 'dead end', and we think that motorists get the point quickly."

California uses the phrase Not a Through Street or Not a Through Road to mark roads or road systems that end in culs-de-sac. More recently, No Outlet has been shown on some signs as well (an example being Meyers Avenue south of Eureka Street in the Pine Hills area).

Uniquely in the United States, a cul-de-sac is labeled a "cove" on street signs in the Memphis, Tennessee, area.

=== Other uses ===
In military parlance, a "cul-de-sac" refers to a situation where an army is "hemmed in on all sides but behind". "Cul-de-sac" is also used metaphorically to mean a line of thought or action that leads nowhere.

In medicine, the expression "cul-de-sac" is used to refer to the recto-uterine pouch, also known as the Pouch of Douglas, the deepest point of the female peritoneal cavity.

== Signage ==
Vienna Convention sign (Most countries use a variant of this sign.)
Australia & Philippines

Austria

Southern African Development Community countries (BW, LS, MW, MZ, NA, ZA, SZ, TZ, ZM, ZW)

Brazil

Canada (Ontario)

Canada (Prince Edward Island)

Canada (Quebec)

Ireland

New Zealand

United Arab Emirates

United States

United States

United States

United States (California)

== See also ==
- Fused grid
- Permeability (spatial and transport planning)
- Turnaround (road)
