= Village Homes =

Planned community in Davis, California

Coordinates: 38°32′50.92″N 121°46′49.83″W

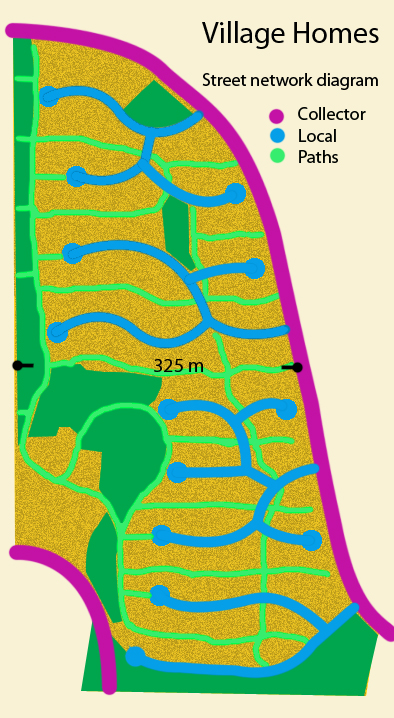
A diagram showing the street and path network of Village Homes.

Village Homes is a planned community in Davis, Yolo County, California. It is designed to be ecologically sustainable by harnessing the energies and natural resources that exist in the landscape, especially stormwater and solar energy.

== History ==
The principal designer of Village Homes was architect Mike Corbett and his wife Judy Corbett, who began planning in the 1960s, with construction continuing from south to north from the 1970s through the 1980s. Village Homes was completed in 1982, and has attracted international attention from its inception as an early model of an environmentally friendly housing development, including a visit from then-French President François Mitterrand.

== Sustainability ==
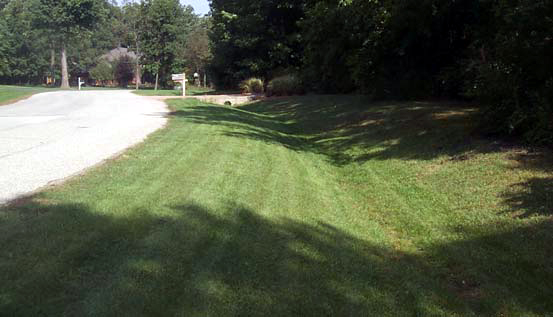
Grass lined swale collects rainwater, which then slowly percolates into the soil, where it is protected from runoff and evaporation.

The 225 homes and 20 apartment units that now are the Village Homes community use solar panels for heating, and they are oriented around common areas at the rear of the buildings, rather than around the street at the front. All streets are oriented east–west, with all lots positioned north–south. This feature has become standard practice in Davis and elsewhere since it enables homes with passive solar designs to make full use of the sun's energy throughout the year. The development also uses natural drainage, called bioswales, to collect water to irrigate the common areas and support the cultivation of edible foods, such as nut and fruit trees and vegetables for consumption by residents, without incurring the cost of using treated municipal water.
