= James Grossman =

American historian

James R. Grossman
- Occupations: Historian, academic
- Years active: c.1990–2025
- Awards: 2025 Tony Horwitz Prize

Academic background
- Education: Cornell University (BS) University of California, Berkeley (PhD)

Academic work
- Institutions: Newberry Library; American Historical Association; University of Chicago; University of California, San Diego
- Main interests: American South, Slavery, Urban history, American labor history
- Notable works: Land of Hope: Chicago, Black Southerners, and the Great Migration; A Chance to Make Good: African-Americans, 1900–1929; The Encyclopedia of Chicago Online

James R. Grossman is an American historian who was the executive director of the American Historical Association from 2010 to 2025. Prior to 2010, he was the Vice President for Research and Education at Newberry Library. He served as the director of the Encyclopedia of Chicago Online and has a research focus on the American South, slavery, urban history and American labor history. He also taught at the University of Chicago and the University of California, San Diego.

== Works ==
- Grossman, James R. (1991). Land of Hope: Chicago, Black Southerners, and the Great Migration. University of Chicago Press. ISBN 978-0-226-30995-8.
