= Land of Hope =

Land of Hope may refer to:

- The Land of Hope (1921 film), a lost film by Edward H. Griffith
- The Land of Hope (2012 film), a Japanese drama film by Sion Sono
- Land of Hope (film), a 2018 Finnish romantic drama film
- Land of Hope (miniseries), a 1986 Australian miniseries
- "Land of Hope" (song), a song by Cold Chisel from the 2019 album Blood Moon
- Land of Hope: Chicago, Black Southerners, and the Great Migration

== See also ==
- Land of Hope and Glory (disambiguation)
