= History of New York City (1665–1783) =

The history of New York City (1665–1783) began with the establishment of English rule over Dutch New Amsterdam and New Netherland. As the newly renamed City of New York and surrounding areas developed, there was a growing independent feeling among some, but the area was divided in its loyalties. The site of modern New York City was the theater of the New York Campaign, a series of major battles in the early American Revolutionary War. After that, the city was under British occupation until the end of the war and was the last port British ships evacuated in 1783.

== Early English Period ==
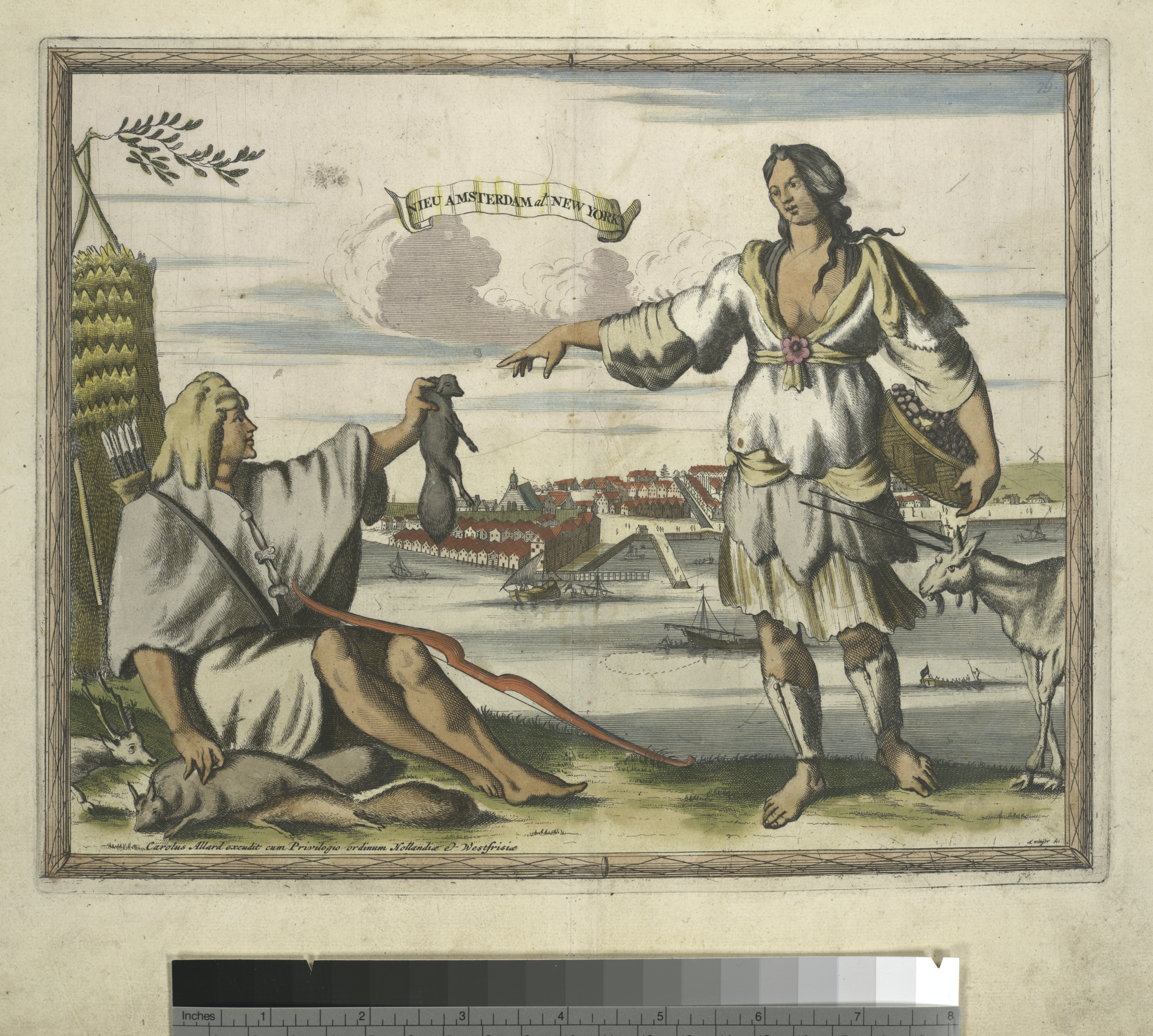
Fur was one reason for having a town here

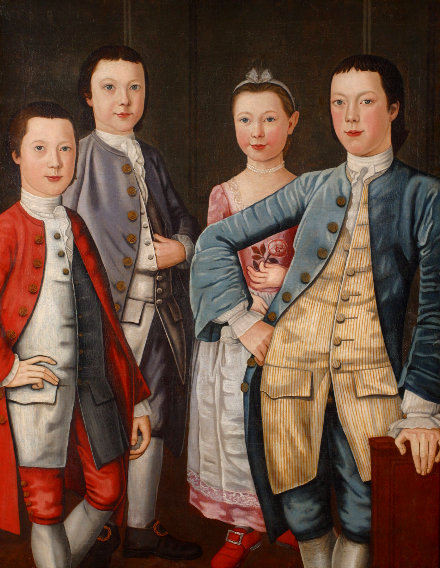
Settlers of New Amsterdam blended into new English colony. The Rapalje Children, 1768, children of trader of early New Amsterdam descent

The English had renamed the colony the "Province of New York", after the king's brother James, Duke of York and on June 12, 1665, appointed Thomas Willett the first of the Mayors of New York. The city grew northward and remained the largest and most important city in the Province of New York, becoming the third largest in the British Empire after London and Philadelphia.

The Dutch regained the colony briefly in 1673, then traded it away to the English in 1674 in the Treaty of Westminster ending the Third Anglo-Dutch War.

Leisler's Rebellion, an uprising in which militia captain Jacob Leisler seized control of lower New York from 1689 to 1691, occurred in the midst of England's "Glorious Revolution". It reflected colonial resentment against King James II, who in the 1680s decreed the formation of the provinces of New York, New Jersey and the Dominion of New England as royal colonies, with New York City designated as the capital. Royal authority was restored in 1691 by English troops sent by James' successor, William III.

New York was cosmopolitan from the beginning, established and governed largely as a strategic trading post. One visitor during the early revolutionary period wrote that "the inhabitants are in general brisk and lively", the women were "handsome", he recorded—as did others new to the city—though, he added, "it rather hurts a European eye to see so many Negro slaves upon the streets". There were numerous marriages of people from different ethnic groups. "Joyce Goodfriend's study of colonial New York City, for instance, suggests that many interracial marriages occurred more because of a lack of opportunity to marry within their own group than a desire to marry outside it. ...over 60% of Englishmen in the New York capital in the late 17th century married women of non-English origins." However, by the 1730s over three fourths of the Dutch men and women still married within their own groups, though by this point there was a generation of children of mixed European ancestry. Freedom of worship was part of the city's foundation, and the trial for libel in 1735 of John Peter Zenger, editor of the New-York Weekly Journal established the principle of freedom of the press in the British colonies. Sephardic Jews expelled from Dutch Brazil after Portuguese recapture, were welcome in New York when the governor realized their value and gave them exemptions from restrictions on Jews.

The New York Slave Insurrection of 1741 raised accusations of arson and conspiracy. Many slaves were executed on unclear charges.

== Revolution ==
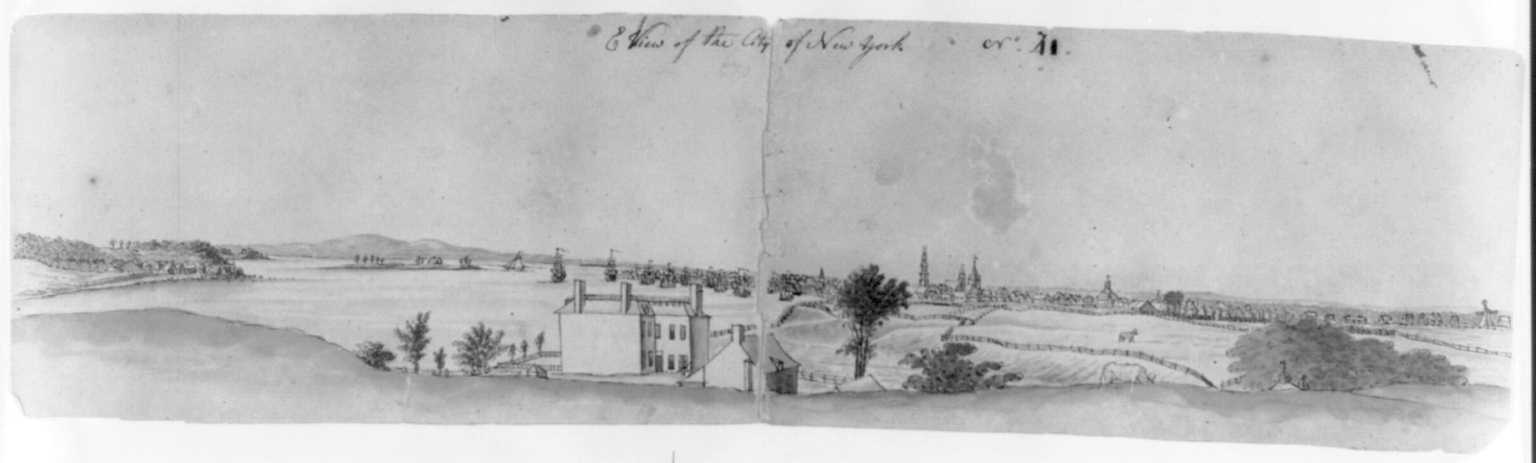
New York City, as seen from Brooklyn in the 1770s. Trinity Church on Wall Street is visible in the distance.

The city was the base for British operations in the French and Indian War (the North American theater of the Seven Years' War) from 1754 to 1763. That conflict united the colonies for the first time in common defense and moreover eliminated the main military threat that the colonists had relied upon Britain to defend them from. When two years after the conclusion of that war in 1765, the British Parliament imposed a Stamp Act to augment local expenditures for defending the colonies, delegates from nine colonies met for the Stamp Act Congress, at what would later be known as Federal Hall in Manhattan, to protest.

The Sons of Liberty, a secret and sometimes violent patriot group, formed chapters in New York and other cities and frightened the royal officials. The "Sons" engaged in a running conflict with British authority in the city over the raising of liberty poles in prominent public locations (see Battle of Golden Hill), from the repeal of the Stamp Act in 1766 until rebel control of the city in 1775. The poles, often when a signal device such as a red cap was placed atop the pole, served as rallying points for public assemblies to protest against the colonial government. The city was the main location of organized political resistance in the form of the Committee of Sixty and then later the New York Provincial Congress. Following the first reading of the Declaration of Independence, the statue of King George III in Bowling Green was torn down and melted into musket balls. The city, however, was a hotbed of Royal fervor and probably held a larger proportion of Tories than any other place in the colonies—though likely still a minority in the city. Many prominent New Yorkers, "living in a commercial city blessed by the profits of empire" were reluctant to "jeopardize their well-established connections to the empire."

General George Washington and his troops moved in to defend Manhattan and New York Harbor in 1776. Prior to roughly one-third of New York City's population fleeing the expected combat, the Continental Army came upon a grand city of wealth, a bustling center of commerce, shipbuilding and maritime trade. The city had been built for seafaring transit and trade, and Manhattan's only connection to the mainland was the narrow, wooden King's bridge over the Harlem River, nearly 11 miles north of the city and ferries across the North (Hudson's) River. Most of the population of 20,000 was crowded into an area of less than a square mile near the East River wharves and the New York Harbor.

The city's traders, stock brokers, and mariners brought with them great wealth. Henry Knox wrote his wife admiring New Yorkers' "magnificent" horse carriages and fine furniture, but condemning their "want of principle", "pride and conceit", "profaneness", and "insufferable" Toryism. Manhattan's free-wheeling ways did create an environment of loose tongues and loose women. A young Presbyterian chaplain "worried what the consequences might be to the American cause of so many of all ranks so habitually taking the name of the Lord in vain." "But alas, swearing abounds, all classes swear.", he lamented.

The abundance of prostitutes in New York City—an estimated 500 women plying "their trade" in 1776—was particularly distressing for many of the Continental soldiers of a Puritan bent, George Washington included. From Lieutenant Isaac Bangs of Massachusetts comes one of the most complete accounts of prostitution in revolutionary America; he had a medical degree from Harvard and took it upon himself to tour the brothel district to inspect the health conditions of the neighborhood and investigate the seedy side of the city that so worried General Washington. He was absolutely appalled by the women of the bawdy houses, who, he thought, "nothing could exceed them in impudence and immodesty", but "the more I became acquainted with them, the more they excelled in their brutality."

April 22, barely a week after the Continental Army arrived in the city, two soldiers were found dead hidden in a bordello, one corpse "castrated in a barbarous manner", Bangs reported. Soldiers went on a rampage in the brothel district "in furious retaliation", General Washington condemned all such "riotous behavior" and ordered military patrols in the district, a strict curfew, and other restrictions. General Washington understood the crucial strategic importance of New York and its waterways to the war effort, but "...had seen enough of New York on prior visits to dislike and distrust the city as the most sinful place in America, a not uncommon view."

== American Revolutionary War ==
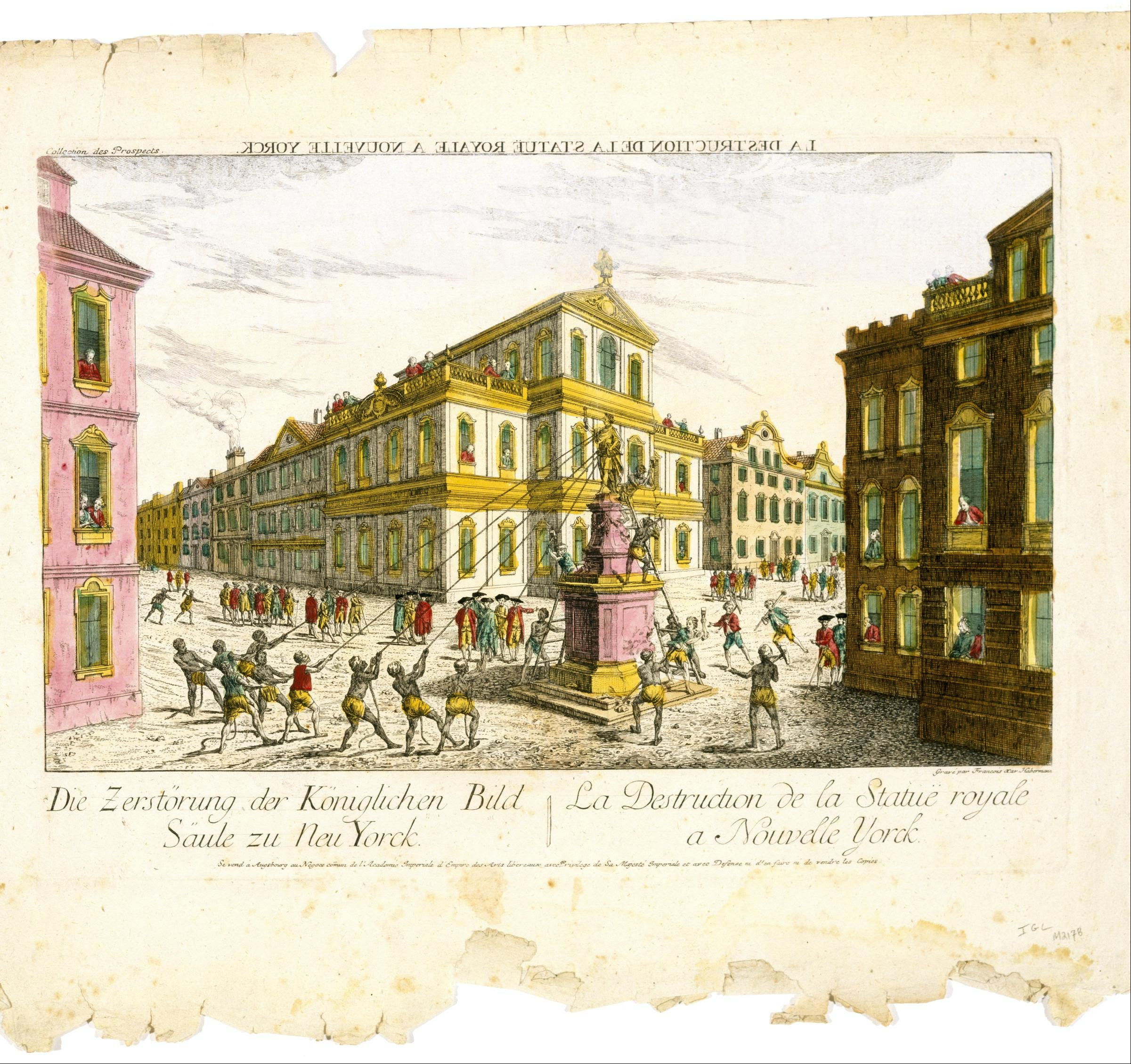
Toppling the statue of the King in New York City

General Washington correctly surmised that after their defeat at the Siege of Boston, the British strategy would be to divide the colonies by capturing the strategic port and waterways of New York City. He began to fortify the city and took personal command of the Continental Army at New York in the summer of 1776. On July 9, 1776, George Washington's aid read the United States Declaration of Independence to his troops and the citizens of New York, who latter stormed to Bowling Green, where there stood a statue of King George III, then proceeded to tie ropes to the statue and yanked it off its pedestal and shipped its remains to Litchfield, Connecticut, where most of the lead from the statue was turned into 42,000 musketballs for the Continental Army. Five battles comprising the New York Campaign were fought around the city limits in late 1776, beginning with the Battle of Long Island in Brooklyn on August 27—the largest battle of the entire war. A quarter of the city structures were destroyed in the Great Fire on September 21, a few days after the British Landing at Kip's Bay and the Battle of Harlem Heights - the lone American victory in this part of the campaign, but doing much to improve morale and keep the army together. Following the highly suspicious fire, British authorities apprehended dozens of people for questioning, including Nathan Hale, who was executed a day later for unrelated charges of espionage. The British conquest of Manhattan was completed with the fall of Fort Washington and the evacuation of Fort Lee (on the Hudson River western shore in New Jersey) on November 16, 1776, and thereafter they held the city without challenge until 1783. Major General James Robertson, commandant in charge of the city, confiscated houses of rebels who had left and distributed them to British officers.

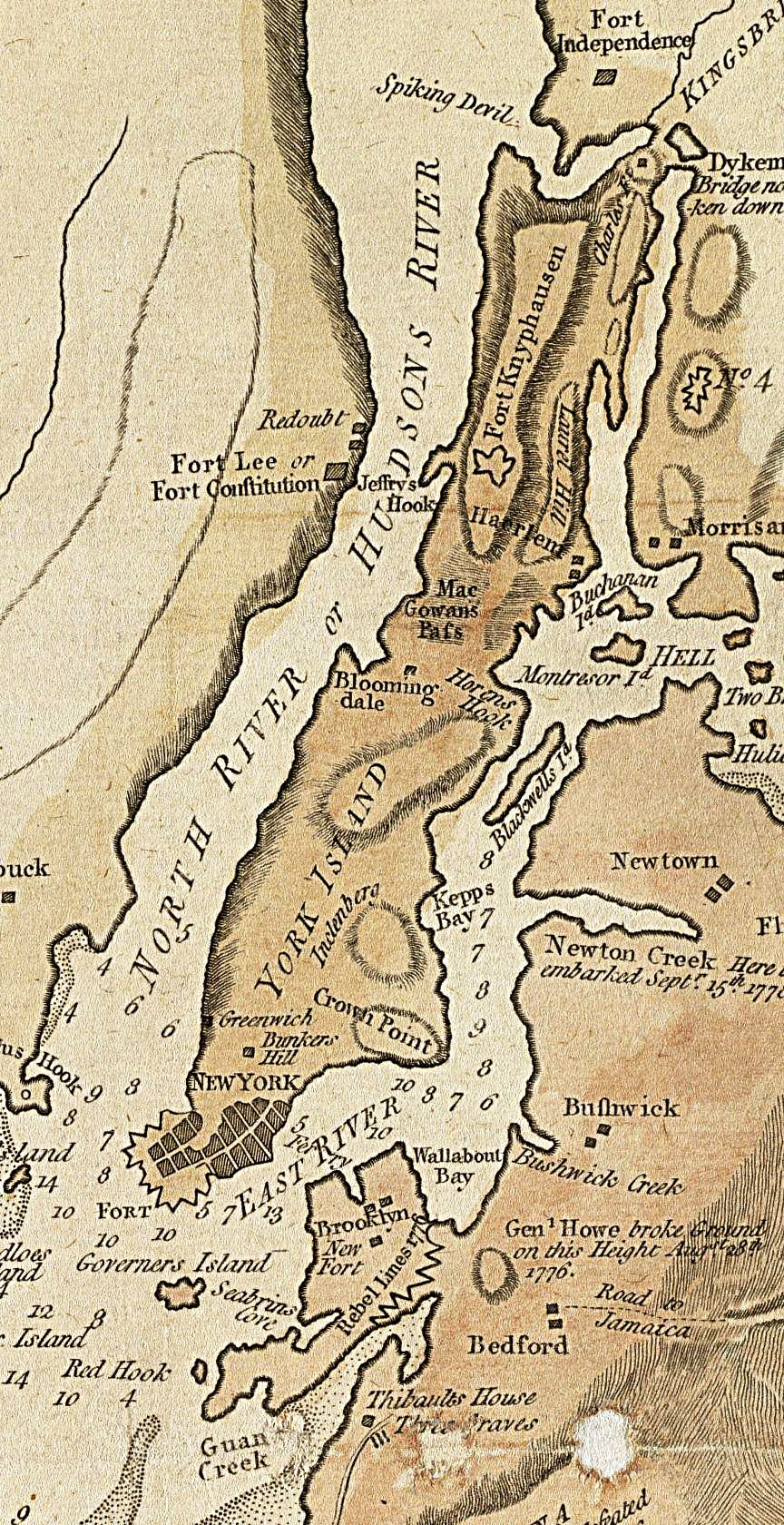
Manhattan and environs, late in the war

Early British military success resulted in military occupation of the city and the exodus of any remaining Patriots combined with a large influx of Loyalist refugees from throughout the former colonies, making the city solidly Loyalist for the remainder of the British occupation. The city became the British political and military center of operations for the rest of the conflict. For this purpose, the map now known as the British Headquarters Map was drawn in 1782, a map of Manhattan Island's largely natural, unengineered condition.

The city's status as the nexus of British control in the region made it the center of attention for Washington's intelligence network. Both British and American intelligence networks existed in New York, with the British network being headed by Major Oliver De Lancey. Additionally, thousands of American prisoners of war were held by the British on prison ships anchored in the nearby Wallabout Bay on the East River between New York and Brooklyn (near the future Prison Ship Martyrs' Monument in Fort Greene Park) for much of the war. New York also served as a primary destination for fugitive American slaves who had fled to the British to gain their freedom as a result of the Philipsburg Proclamation. This made the city "an island of freedom in a sea of slavery", with the former slaves finding work in construction or working for British forces as domestic servants. In the weeks leading up the British evacuation, many American slaveholders went to New York, attempting to re-enslave people that had formerly belonged to them. British officers flatly refused to return their colored troops to slavery, and impeded the recovery of civilian former slaves. On November 1783, the last British troops evacuated New York along with many Loyalists and former slaves.

== Social upheaval ==
When the British left in 1783, they took along many loyalists including prominent businessmen, lawyers, financiers and clergymen. The Anglican Church had been especially powerful in the colonial era, and it began to lose much of its influence in the area as many prominent members departed. It lost its funding from the British Society for the Propagation of the Gospel, was soon after disestablished by the state in 1784, and therefore lost control of King's College (now Columbia University). The city was more democratic and much more open to ambitious entrepreneurs from middle-class and poor backgrounds.

== Notes ==
Preceded by History of New York City (prehistory–1664)	History of New York City (1665–1783)	Succeeded by History of New York City (1784–1854)
