= History of New York City (1784–1854) =

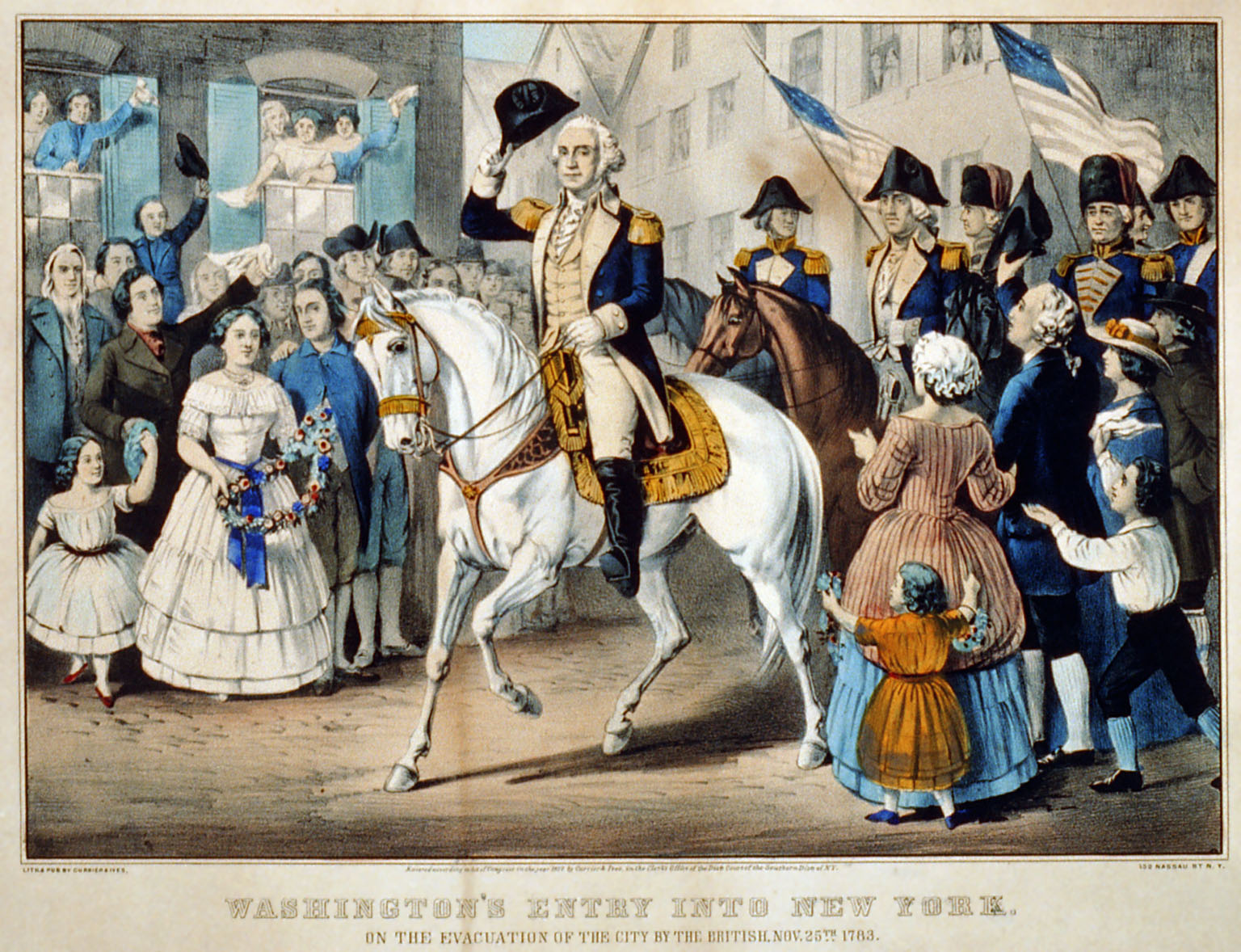
George Washington enters New York in triumph following the British evacuation of America.

The history of New York City (1784–1854) started with the creation of the city as the capital of the United States under the Congress of the Confederation from January 11, 1785, to Autumn 1788, and then under the United States Constitution from its ratification in 1789 until moving to Philadelphia in 1790. The city grew as an economic center with the opening of the Erie Canal in 1825; the growth of its railroads added to its dominance. Tammany Hall began to grow in influence with the support of many Irish immigrants, culminating in the election of the first Tammany mayor, Fernando Wood, in 1854. The city had become the nation's most important port and financial center and competed with Boston as the center of high culture.

== Status ==
=== As a capital city ===
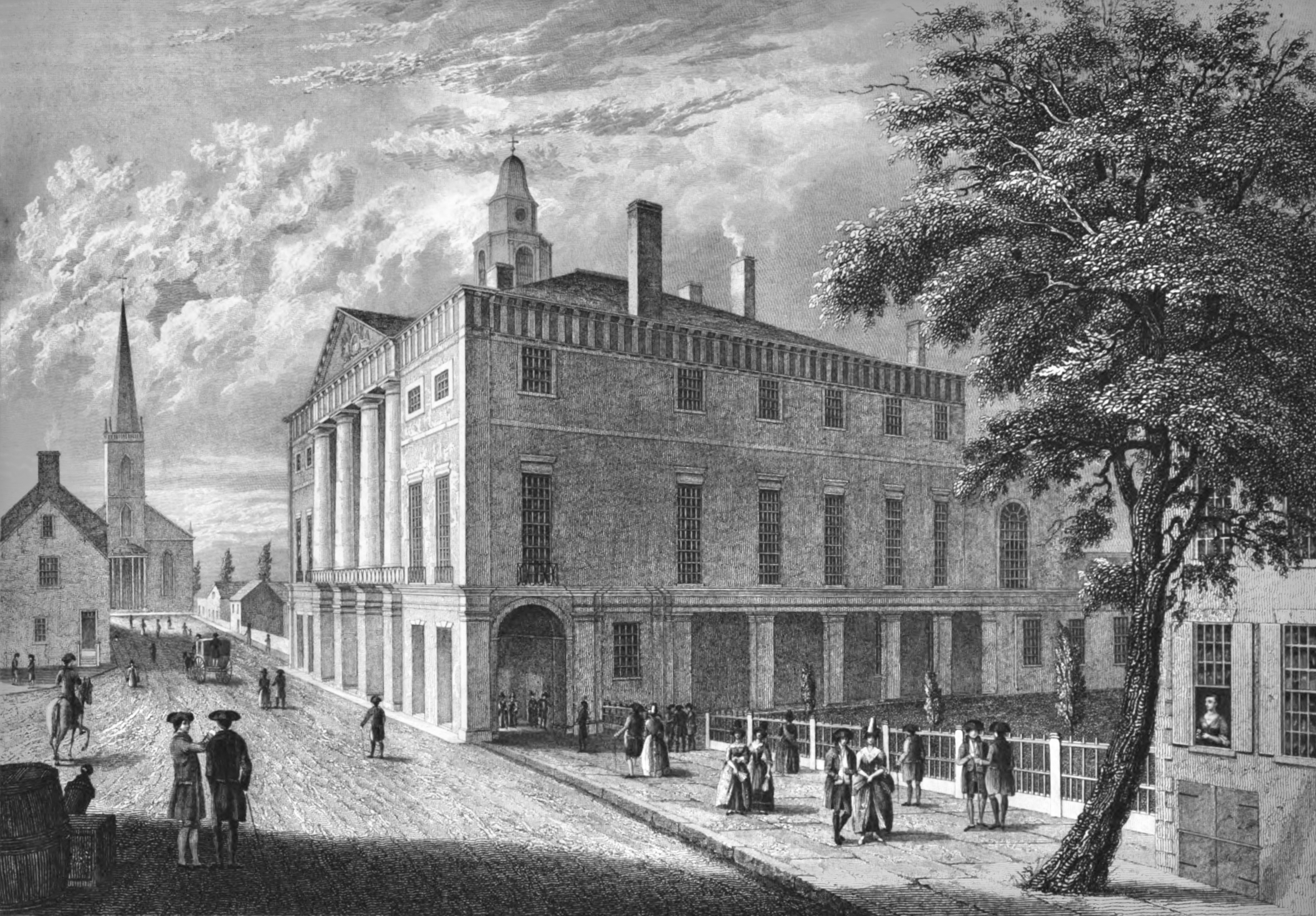
City Hall (later Federal Hall), 1789

With the signing of the Treaty of Paris in 1783 and the resulting withdrawal of British troops from the city, the Congress of the Confederation moved to Federal Hall on Wall Street in 1785. The first government of the United States, operating under the Articles of Confederation and Perpetual Union since its ratification in 1781, was soon found inadequate for the needs of the new nation. However, certain successes were achieved while in New York, including the passage of the Northwest Ordinance, which laid the framework for the addition of new states into the Union.

A call for revision to the Articles was led by New Yorker Alexander Hamilton, and the Annapolis Convention was convened with representatives from the states to discuss the necessary changes. Lacking representation from all of the states, the convention made no suggestions for changing the Articles but instead drafted a report that led to the creation of a Constitutional Convention in 1787 to create an entirely new governing document.

=== As a federal city ===
The city's and state's status within the new union under the United States Constitution written in 1787 was under question when Governor George Clinton proved reluctant to submit state power to a strong national government and was opposed to ratification. Some New York City businessmen proposed New York City secession as an alternative to joining the union separately, but Alexander Hamilton and others argued persuasively in the Federalist Papers, published in city newspapers, for state ratification, which after much dispute finally passed in 1788. George Washington was inaugurated as the first President of the United States on the balcony of Federal Hall in 1789, and the United States Bill of Rights was drafted in the city. The Supreme Court of the United States sat for the first time in New York. After 1790, Congress left for Philadelphia.

== Population growth and economic leadership ==
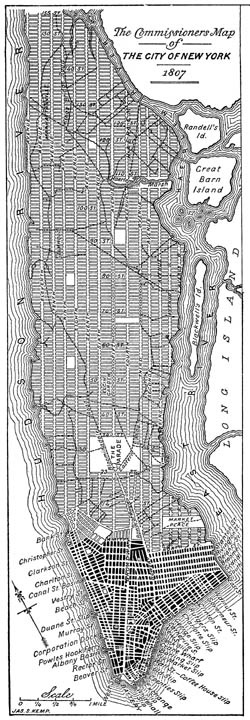
An 1807 version of the Commissioner's Grid plan for Manhattan; it was adopted in 1811.

New York remained a cosmopolitan enclave within America. The new French consul gave a report in 1810:

"its inhabitants, who are for the most part foreigners and made up of every nation except Americans so to speak, have in general no mind for anything but business. New York might be described as a permanent fair in which two-thirds of the population is always being replaced; where huge business deals are being made, almost always with fictitious capital, and where luxury has reached alarming heights... It is in the countryside and in the inland towns that one must look for the American population of New York State." (quoted by Fernand Braudel, The Perspective of the World, 1984 p 406).

The French consul's "fictitious capital" betokens the world of credit, on which New Yorkers' confidence has been based. The Commissioners' Plan of 1811 imposed a surveyed grid upon all of Manhattan's varied terrain, in a far-reaching though perhaps topographically insensitive vision.

New York, with a population of 96,000 in 1810, surged far beyond its rivals, reaching a population of 1,080,000 in 1860, compared to 566,000 in Philadelphia, 212,000 in Baltimore and 178,000 in Boston. Historian Robert Albion identifies four aggressive moves by New York entrepreneurs and politicians that helped it jump to the top of American cities. Of greatest importance, it sponsored the Erie Canal, which began operations in 1825, forming a continuous water route from New York north to Albany via the Hudson River, then west to Buffalo using the new canal to reach the Great Lakes. It opened a large new market in upstate New York and the Old Northwest. New York set up an auction system that efficiently and rapidly sold imported cargoes to the highest bidder. Exporters from Britain discovered New York offered the best prices for their goods, and they increasingly ignored Boston and Philadelphia, where the local merchants tried to impose higher markups by avoiding auctions. New York began the world's first regular packet service to England with the Black Ball Line in 1818. By 1830, it dominated the nation's merchant marine. Ambitious shippers reached beyond the natural hinterland to open large-scale coastal trade, especially one that brought Southern cotton to New York for export to textile mills in the Northeast and in Europe, and carried manufactured products to the South. By 1830, 40 cents of every dollar the mills paid for cotton went to New York brokers to cover the cost of shipping. The main rivals, Boston Philadelphia and Baltimore, tried to compete with the Erie Canal by opening their own networks of canals and railroads; they never caught up. Manufacturing was not a major factor in the city's growth in the 19th century—factories were chiefly being built in towns and smaller cities with waterfalls and fast rivers that were harnessed to generate the power, or were closer to coal supplies.

In 1792, a group of merchants made the "Buttonwood Agreement" and began meeting under a buttonwood tree on Wall Street, beginning the New York Stock Exchange, while a yellow fever epidemic that summer sent New Yorkers fleeing north to nearby healthful Greenwich Village. In 1797, Aaron Burr took control of Tammany Hall and used it to win the state's electoral vote in the 1800 presidential election.

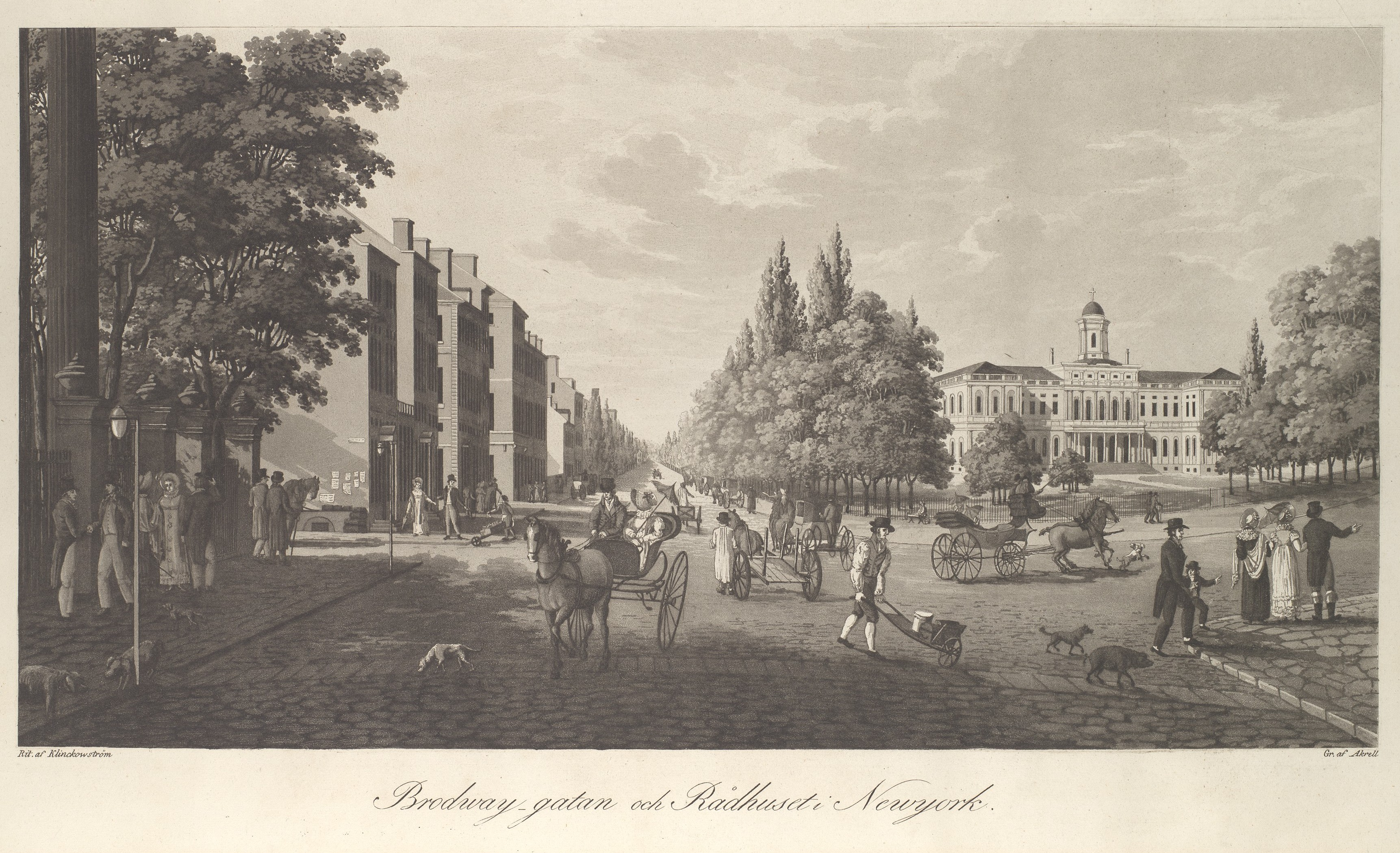
Broadway in 1824

In 1807, Robert Fulton initiated a steamboat line from New York City to Albany, which accelerated the movement of cargo and passengers upriver. Lumber and coal were the main products brought into New York. The establishment of regular steam ferries spurred the growth of Brooklyn, which was established as a city in 1834.

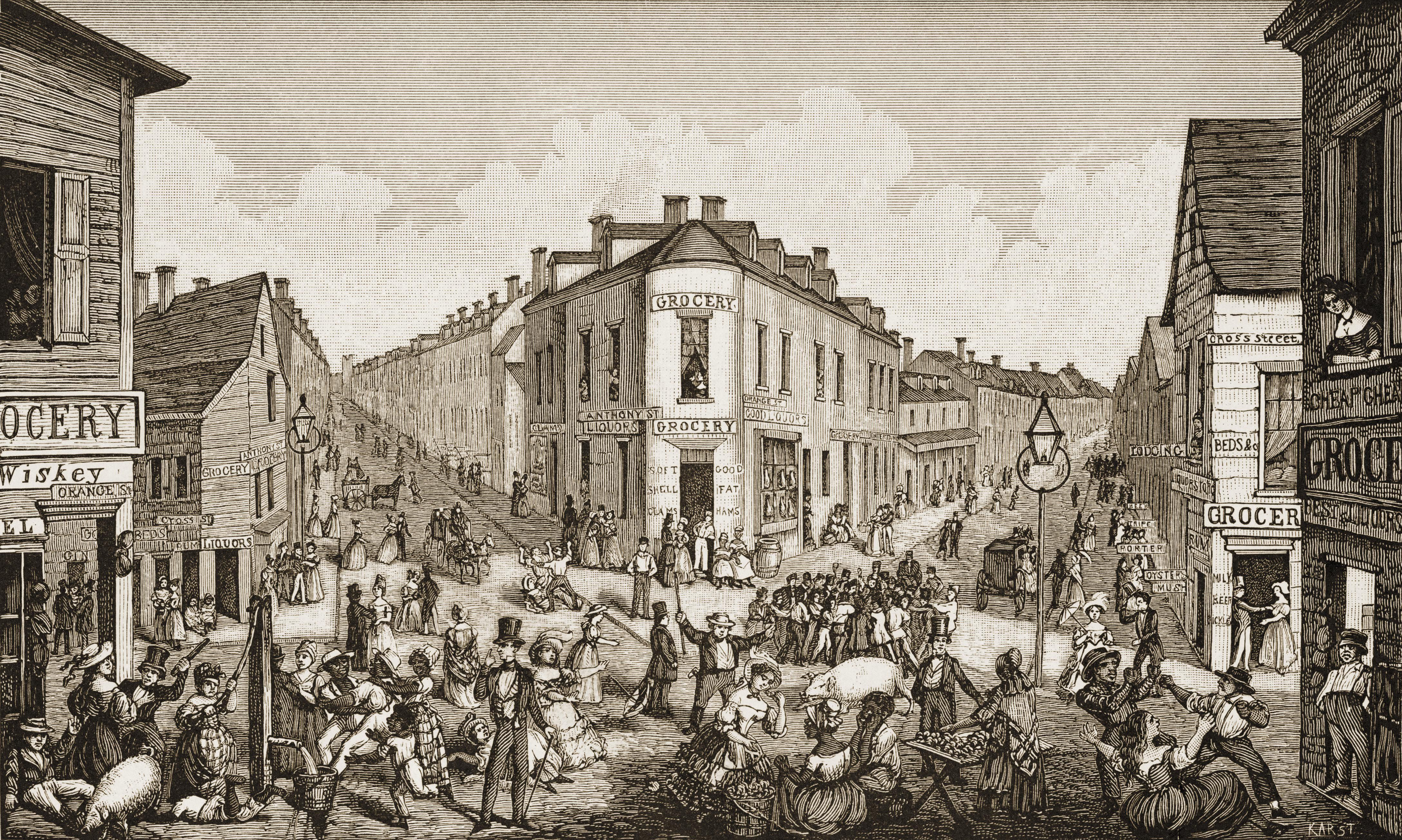
The Five Points depicted circa 1829

On September 3, 1821, the Norfolk and Long Island Hurricane caused a storm surge of 13 ft in one hour, leading to widespread flooding south of Canal Street, but few deaths were reported. The hurricane is estimated to have been a Category 3 event and to have made landfall at Jamaica Bay, making it the only hurricane in recorded history to directly strike New York City. In 2011, Hurricane Irene weakened to tropical storm and made landfall in Coney Island.

In 1824, a riot occurred in Greenwich Village between Irish Protestants and Catholics, after a parade by members of the Orange Order. This was a precursor of the Orange Riots of the 1870s.

Immigrants provided a ready resource for those opposing abolition of slavery. These were often led by gangsters from the Bowery and Five Points. On July 7, 1834, a series of riots started, terminating in the destruction of St. Phillip's Negro Church on Center Street and generally terrorizing the Five Points area.

In 1831, as the city continued to expand, the University of the City of New York, now New York University, was founded at Washington Square in Greenwich Village. The first of a series of cholera epidemics began in 1832. By 1835, with the epidemic past, Manhattan was in the throes of the first of its building booms.

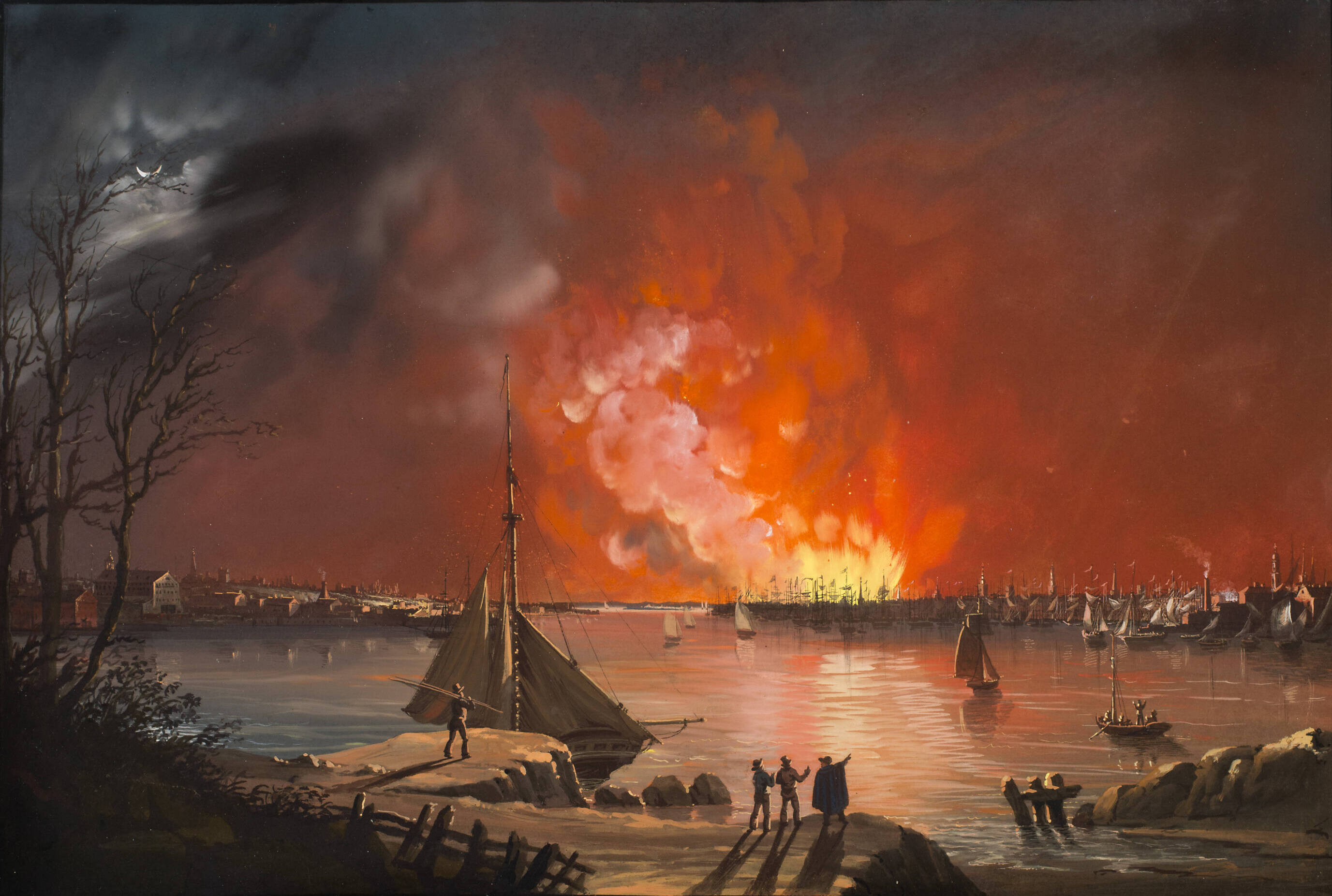
The Great Fire of 1835, as seen from Williamsburgh.

Late on December 16, 1835, the Great Fire of New York broke out. The temperature was below zero (F), and gale-force winds were blowing. Firemen, some called from as far away as Philadelphia, were at first helpless to battle the wind-driven fire because of icing lines and pumps. The fire leveled 50 acres (200,000 square meters) in the Financial District. Some merchandise was carried to churches that were thought to be fireproof, but several of these burned anyway. Eventually, the fire was controlled by blowing up buildings in the fire's path.

Many of the merchants who lost their stores thought they would be covered by insurance, but the tremendous losses, and, in many cases, the destruction of the insurance company headquarters in the financial district, bankrupted the insurance firms, and much of the loss was not covered.

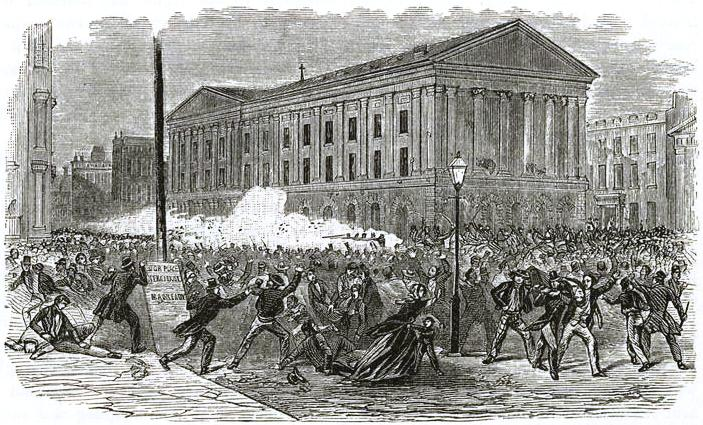
The Astor Place Riot in 1849

The fires of the period and the increased need for water for industry led to the construction of the Croton Aqueduct water system between 1837 and 1842. The aqueduct brought fresh water from the Croton Dam in northern Westchester County over the High Bridge to the Receiving Reservoir between 79th Street and 86th Street and Sixth and Seventh Avenues. From the Receiving Reservoir water flowed into the Distributing Reservoir, better known as the Croton Reservoir. The aqueduct opened on October 14, 1842, with great celebration. President John Tyler, former presidents John Quincy Adams and Martin van Buren, and New York Governor William H. Seward were among those in attendance.

The city's rapid development was again interrupted by the Panic of 1837. The city recovered and by mid-century established itself as the financial and mercantile capital of the western hemisphere.

The Great New York City Fire of 1845 destroyed 345 wooden buildings in the Financial District.

The Hudson River Railroad (which grew into the New York Central) opened October 3, 1851; it extended the Mohawk and Hudson Railroad, the first railroad built in the state, south to New York City.

== Rise of the immigrant city ==
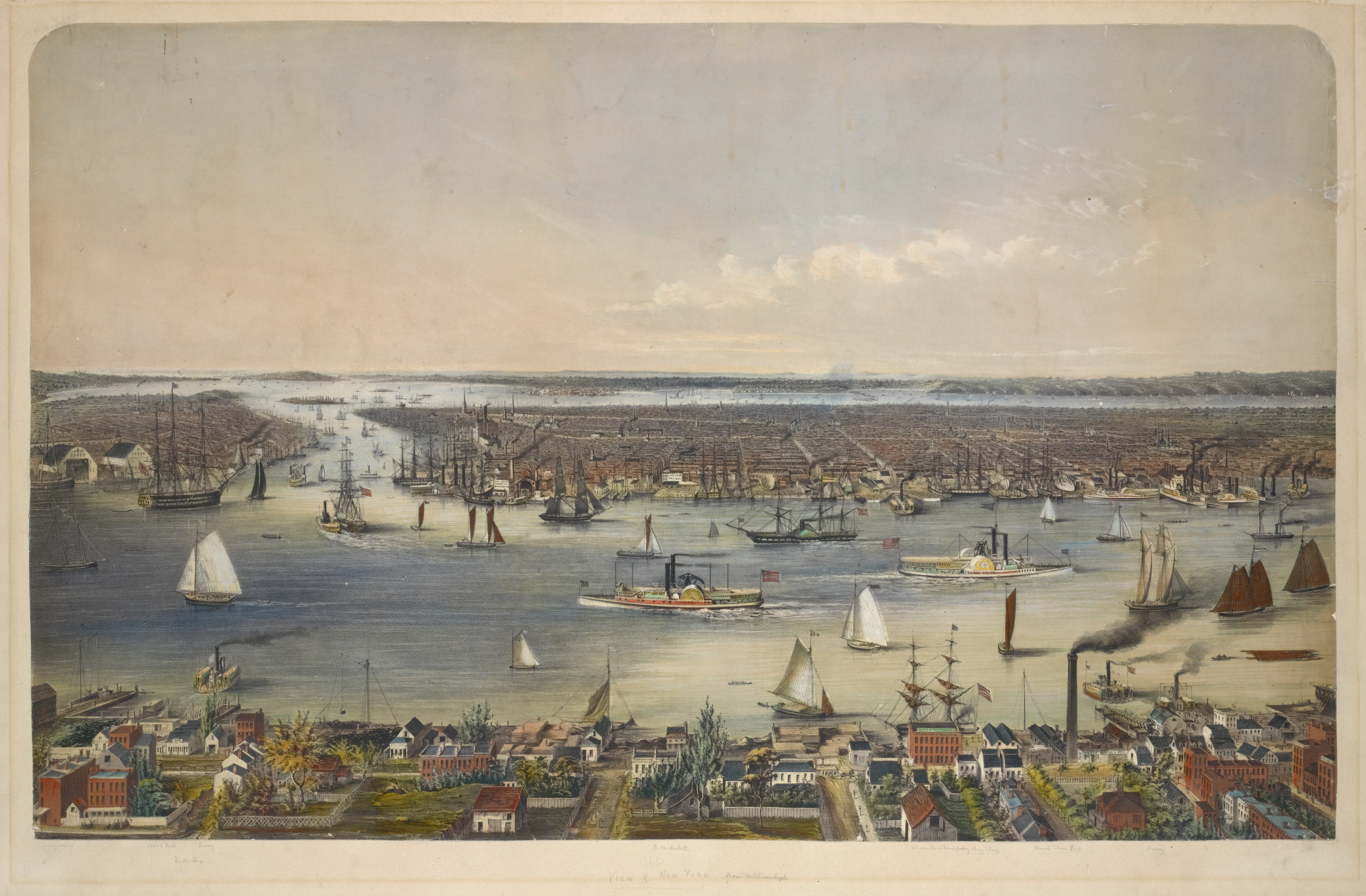
New York City and the East River, 1848.

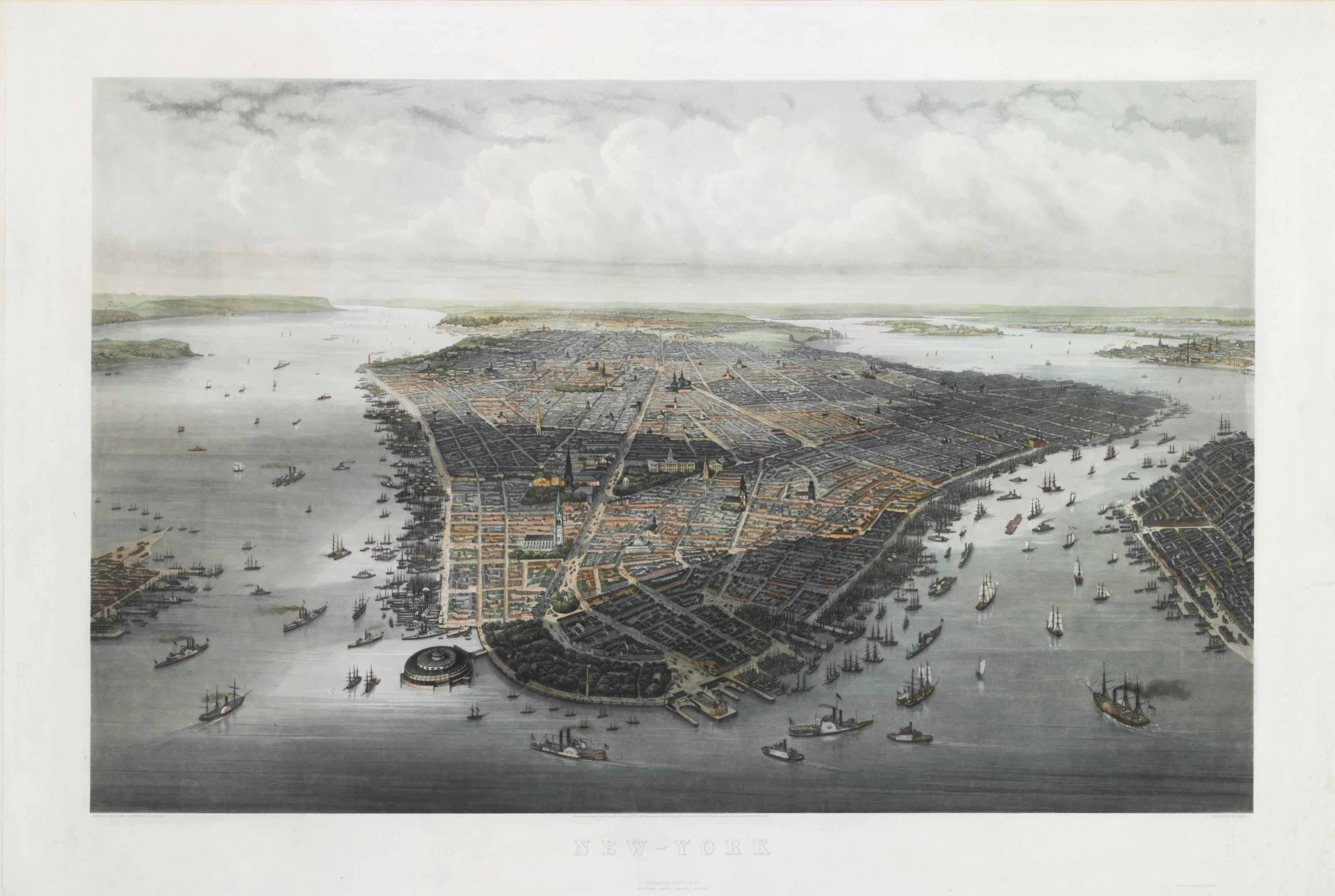
Bird's-eye view of New York City, 1851

The city and its nearby suburbs grew rapidly for several reasons. The natural harbor at the base of Manhattan, Brooklyn, and the New Jersey ports at Jersey City, Newark and Elizabeth provided almost unlimited capacity for trading ships and protection from storms. Not until 1985 did New York lose its place as the busiest port in the world.

Other cities, like Boston, Baltimore, and Philadelphia, had good natural harbors, but New York's advantage over other cities of the Eastern Seaboard was that the Hudson River and the Erie Canal formed the only water route through the Appalachian Mountains.

The city's cosmopolitan attitude and tolerance of many different cultures encouraged many different types of immigrant groups to settle in the city. Starting in the late 1840s, the city saw increased Irish immigration with the Great Irish Famine and German immigration with the Revolutions of 1848. People who came from Ireland were poor, without knowledge of their new world; once arrived on the docks, unscrupulous landlords offered them squalid tenements that were once houses for middle-class New Yorkers. They crowded into dirty rooms, and the slums of the city became known for high rates of disease. Immigrants were skilled laborers and craftsmen; Germans settled in a new neighborhood named "Kleindeutschland" (Little Germany) and opened many shops where they worked as artisans. Many Irish immigrants were responsible for building the subway and sky-scrapers.

Raw unregulated capitalism created large middle, upper-middle and upper classes, but its need for manpower encouraged immigration into the city on an unprecedented scale, with mixed results. The famed "melting pot" was brought into being, from which multitudes have since arisen in the successful pursuit of the American Dream. In the mid-to-late 19th century, areas of poverty could be found in contrast between rich stretches of lower Broadway, Washington Square, Gramercy Park and Lafayette Street (wealth that would later take up more extravagant residence on Fifth Avenue) and the squalid enclave of Five Points (abject poverty that was later to occupy the Lower East Side).

Tammany Hall's influence increased with its courting of the immigrant Irish vote, leading to the election of the first Tammany mayor, Fernando Wood, in 1854, and a trend of consolidation was beginning in the region with the three-year-old City of Williamsburgh joining Brooklyn in 1855, establishing it as America's third largest city.

== See also ==
- American urban history
- Timeline of New York City, 19th century

== Notes ==
Preceded by History of New York City (1665–1783)	History of New York City (1784–1854)	Succeeded by History of New York City (1855–1897)
