= Land of Hope: Chicago, Black Southerners, and the Great Migration =

1991 book by James R. Grossman

- Author: James R. Grossman
- Genre: History
- Publisher: University of Chicago Press
- Publication date: 1989
- ISBN: 978-0-226-30996-5
- Dewey Decimal: 977.3/1100496073—dc19
- LC Class: F548.9.N4G760

Land of Hope: Chicago, Black Southerners, and the Great Migration is a non-fiction book by James R. Grossman, published by University of Chicago Press in 1989. It received several positive reviews in the academic community and was noted as a significant contribution to scholarly work on the black community's experience of migration to Chicago from southern states.

== Synopsis ==
The book is in two parts, with the latter describing how the Southerners had lived in Chicago.

The research included government records, manuscripts, and other archival material.

== Background ==
James Grossman was the executive director of the American Historical Association between 2010 and 2025 and, prior to 2010, the vice president for research and education at Newberry Library. He served as the director of the Encyclopedia of Chicago Online and has a research focus on the American South, slavery, urban history and American labor history. He also formerly taught at the University of Chicago and the University of California, San Diego.

== Reception and analysis ==
Daniel Letwin of the College of the Holy Cross (Note: Letwin was visiting history instructor at Holy Cross 1989–1991; later, he was appointed Associate Professor of History at Pennsylvania State University's College of the Liberal Arts.) stated that this book has "much in common" with Making Their Own Way: Southern Blacks' Migration to Pittsburgh, 1916-30, although compared to the other book Land of Hope is more "comprehensive". Jon C. Teaford of Purdue University compared the work to American Exodus: The Dust Bowl Migration and Okie Culture in California, in that African-Americans saw Chicago as an important destination for similar reasons that "Okies" escaping the Dust Bowl saw California as an important destination.

Jacqueline A. Rouse of Georgia State University praised the descriptions of community organizing and giving agency to African-American migrants.

Clarence E. Walker of University of California, Davis wrote that the work is "thoughtful, well-researched, and provocative".

Vernon J. Williams Jr. of Purdue University described the work as "authoritative and significant".

== See also ==
- History of African Americans in Chicago
