= History of New York City (prehistory–1664) =

The history of New York City has been influenced by the prehistoric geological formation during the last glacial period of the territory that is today New York City. The area was shortly inhabited by the Lenape; after initial European exploration in the 17th century, the Dutch established New Amsterdam in 1624. In 1664, the British conquered the area and renamed it "New York".

== Lenape settlement ==
According to archaeological digs, the first humans arrived in the region as early as 9,000 years ago. However, the area was abandoned, perhaps as a result of the local extinction of many large game species that were a source of food for the first settlers due to the warming climate of the area.

A second wave of inhabitants entered the region approximately 3,000 years ago and left behind more advanced hunting implements such as bows and arrows. The remains of approximately 8,000 such early encampments have been found throughout the city. The region has probably remained continually inhabited from that time.

By the time of the arrival of Europeans, the Lenape were cultivating fields of vegetation through slash-and-burn agriculture. This extended the productive life of planted fields. They also harvested vast quantities of fish and shellfish from the bays of the area and, in southern New Jersey, harvested clams year-round. The success of these methods allowed the inhabitants to maintain a larger population than nomadic hunter-gatherers elsewhere could support. Scholars have estimated that at the time of European settlement, there may have been about 15,000 Lenape total in approximately 80 settlement sites around much of the New York City area alone. In 1524, Lenape in canoes met Giovanni da Verrazzano, the first European explorer to enter New York Harbor, who called the area New Angoulême to honor his patron, King Francis I of France.

== Dutch colonization ==
In 1613, the Dutch established a trading post on the western shore of Manhattan Island. Juan Rodrigues was the first documented non-native to live on Manhattan Island.

In 1614, the New Netherland company was established, and consequently they settled a second fur trading post in what is today Albany, called Fort Nassau. It was not until 1623, however, that the Dutch interests in the area were other than commercial, and under the auspices of the newly formed Dutch West India Company they built Fort Amsterdam in 1624, a crude fortification that stood on the location of the present Alexander Hamilton U.S. Custom House on Bowling Green. The fort was designed mainly to protect the company's trading operations further upriver from attack by other European powers. Within a year, a small settlement, called New Amsterdam had grown around the fort, with a population that included mostly the garrison of company troops, as well as a contingent of Walloon, French and Flemish Huguenot families who were brought in primarily to farm the nearby land of lower Manhattan and supply the company operations with food. Sarah Rapelje (b.1625) was the first European born in the future New York City. Later in 1626, Peter Minuit purchased Manhattan Island and Staten Island from native people in exchange for trade goods.

The Dutch took heavy advantage of the Indigenous reliance on wampum as a trading medium by exchanging European-made metal tools for beaver pelts. By using such tools, the Indigenous greatly increased the rate of production of wampum, debasing its value for trade. Lenape men abandoned hunting and fishing for food in favor of beaver trapping. Moreover, the Dutch began manufacturing their own wampum in order to further dominate the trading network among themselves and the Indigenous (a practice undertaken by the settlers in New England as well). As a result of this increase, beavers were largely trapped out in the Five Boroughs within two decades, leaving the Lenape largely dependent on the Dutch. As a result, the Indigenous population declined drastically throughout the 17th century through a combination of disease, starvation, and outward migration.

As the beaver trade shifted to Upstate New York, New Amsterdam became an increasingly important trading hub for the coast of North America. Since New Netherland was a trading operation and not viewed as colonization enterprise for transplanting Dutch culture, the directors of New Netherland were largely unconcerned with the ethnic and racial balance of the community. The economic activity brought in a wide variety of ethnic groups to the fledgling city during the 17th century, including Spanish, Jews, and Africans, some of them as slaves.

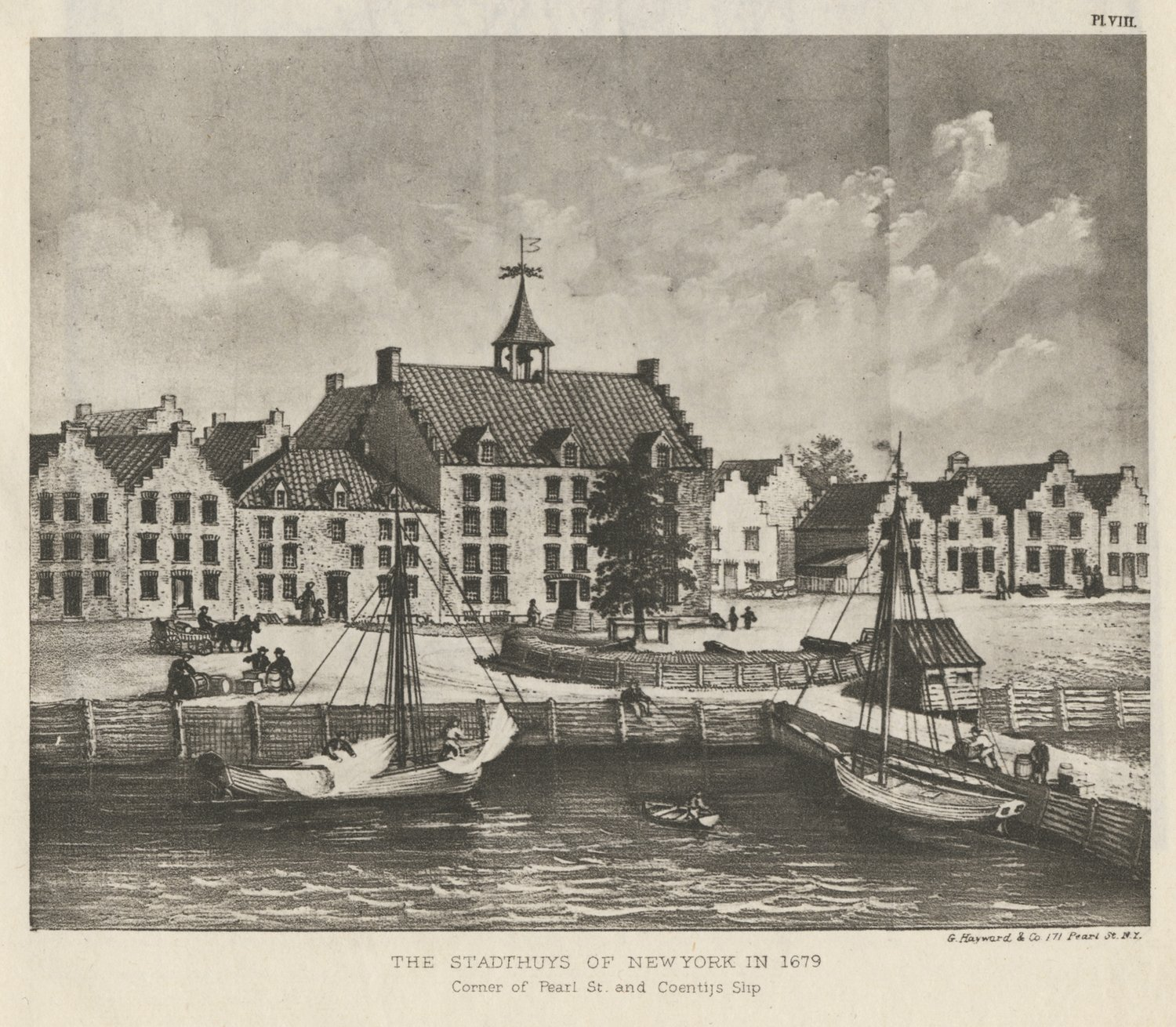
Stadt Huys (City Hall) in 1679

The Dutch origins can still be seen in many names in New York City, such as Coney Island (from "Konijnen Eiland" – Dutch for "Rabbit Island"), Bowery from bouwerij (modern Dutch boerderij = "farm"), Brooklyn (from Breukelen), Harlem from Haarlem (formalized in 1658 as Nieuw Haarlem), Greenwich Village (from Greenwijck, meaning "pine wood quarter"), Flushing (from Vlissingen) and Staten Island (from "Staaten Eylandt").

Willem Kieft became director general in 1638 but five years later was embroiled in Kieft's War against the Indigenous. The Pavonia Massacre, across the Hudson River in present-day Jersey City resulted in the death of eighty Indigenous in February 1643. Following the massacre, eleven Algonquian tribes joined forces and nearly defeated the Dutch. Holland sent additional forces to the aid of Kieft, which took part in the overwhelming defeat of the Indigenous, leading to a peace treaty on August 29, 1645, to end the war.

Manhattan Island was in some measure self-selected as a future metropolis by its natural harbor formed by New York Bay (actually the drowned lower river valley of the Hudson River, enclosed by glacial moraines), the East River (actually a tidal strait) and the Hudson River, all of which are confluent at the southern tip, from which all later development spread. Also of prime importance was the presence of deep fresh water aquifers near the southern tip, especially the Collect Pond, and an unusually varied geography ranging from marshland to large outcrops of Manhattan schist, a hard metamorphic rock that is ideal for foundations of large buildings.

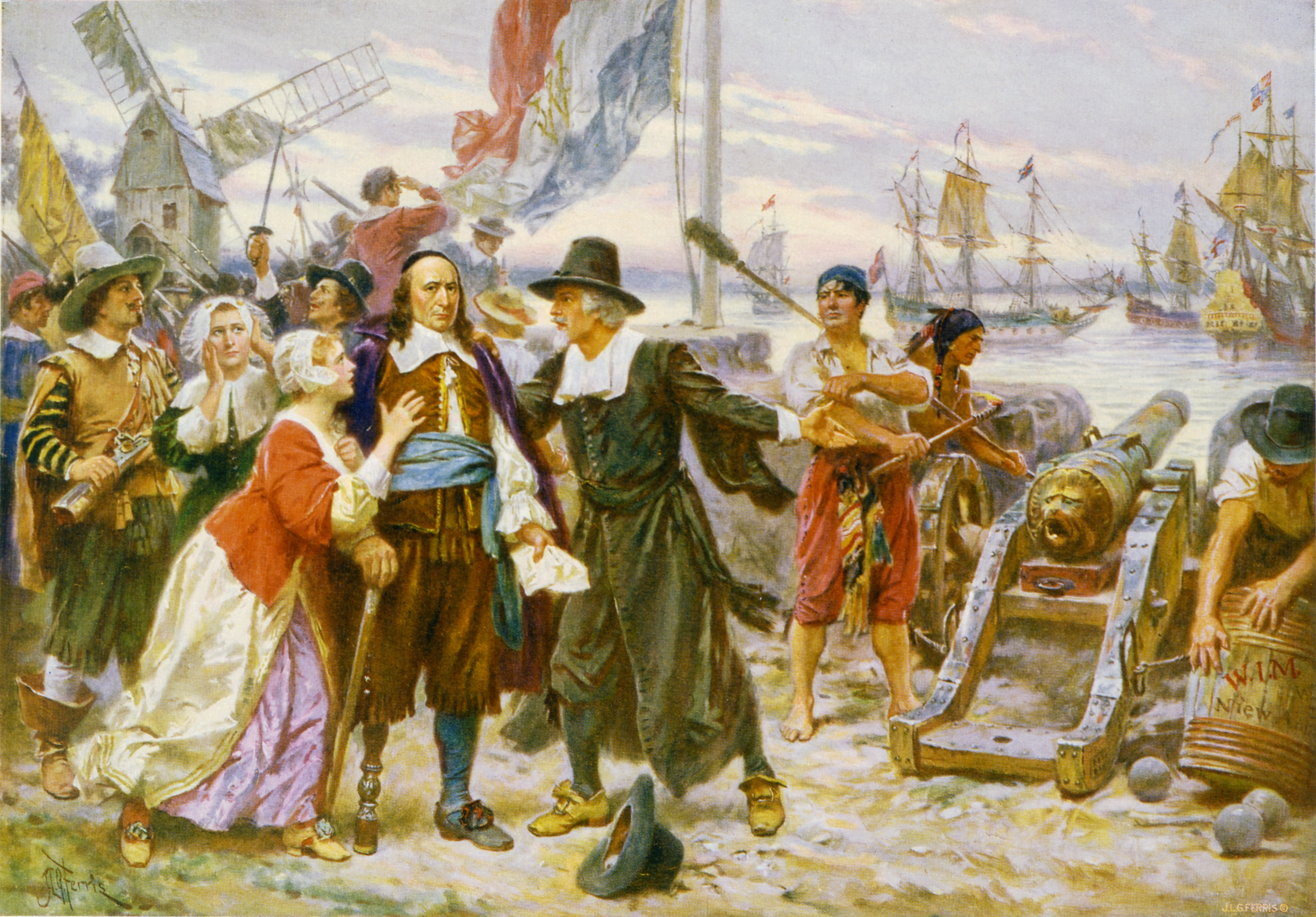
The Fall of New Amsterdam

== English conquest ==
In 1664, British ships entered Gravesend Bay in modern Brooklyn, and troops marched to capture the ferry across the East River to the city, with minimal resistance: the governor at the time, Peter Stuyvesant, was unpopular with the residents of the city. Articles of Capitulation 1664 were drawn up, the Dutch West India Company's colors were struck on September 8, 1664, and the soldiers of the garrison marched to the East River for the trip home to the Netherlands. The date of 1664 appeared on New York City's corporate seal until 1975, when the date was changed to 1625 to reflect the year of Dutch incorporation as a city and to incidentally allow New York to celebrate its 350th anniversary just 11 years after its 300th.

The British renamed the colony "New York", after the king's brother James, Duke of York and on June 12, 1665, appointed Thomas Willett the first of the mayors of New York. The city grew northward, remaining the largest and most important city in the colony of New York.

== Notes ==
| Preceded by N/A | History of New York City (prehistory–1664) | Succeeded by History of New York City (1665–1783) |
