= American urban history =

Study of cities of the United States

American urban history is the study of cities of the United States. Local historians have always written about their own cities. Starting in the 1920s and led by Arthur Schlesinger, Sr. at Harvard, professional historians began comparative analysis of what cities have in common, using theoretical models and scholarly biographies of specific cities. The United States has also had a long history of hostility to the city, as characterized for example by Thomas Jefferson's agrarianism and the Populist movement of the 1890s. Mary Sies (2003) argues:

At the start of the twenty-first century, North American urban history is flourishing. Compared to twenty-five years ago, the field has become more interdisciplinary and intellectually invigorating. Scholars are publishing increasingly sophisticated efforts to understand how the city as space intersects the urbanization process, as well as studies that recognize the full complexity of experiences for different metropolitan cohorts.

== Historiography ==
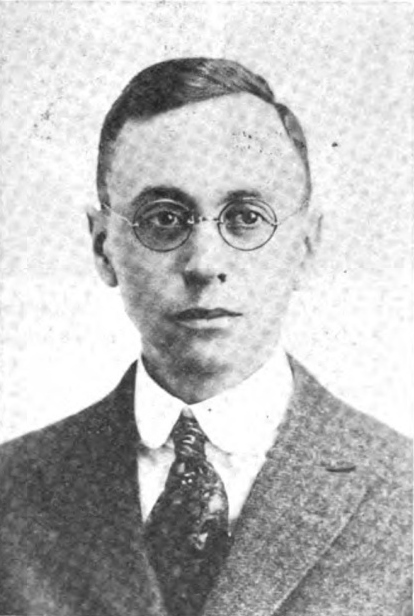
Arthur Schlesinger Sr.

American urban history is a branch of the history of the United States and of the broader field of urban history, which examines the historical development of cities and towns and the process of urbanization. The approach is often multidisciplinary, crossing boundaries into fields like social history, architectural history, urban sociology, urban geography, business history, and even archaeology. Urbanization and industrialization were popular themes for 20th-century historians, often tied to an implicit model of modernization, or the transformation of rural traditional societies.

From the 1920s to the 1990s many influential monographs began as one of the 140 PhD dissertations at Harvard University directed by Arthur M. Schlesinger Sr. or Oscar Handlin. Schlesinger and his students took a group approach to history, sharply playing down the role of individuals. Handlin added a focus on groups defined by ethnicity (that is Germans, Irish, Jews, Italians Hispanics etc.) or by class (working class or middle class). The Harvard model was that the urban environment, including the interaction with other groups, shaped their history and group outlook.

=== New urban history ===
The "new urban history" was a short-lived movement that attracted a great deal of attention In the 1960s, then quickly disappeared. It used statistical methods and innovative computer techniques to analyze manuscript census data, person by person, focusing especially on the geographical and social mobility of random samples of residents. Numerous monographs appeared, but it proved frustrating to interpret the results. Historian Stephan Thernstrom, the leading promoter of the new approach, soon disavowed it, saying it was neither new nor urban nor history.

Overall urban history grew rapidly in the 1970s and 1980s, stimulated by the surge of interest in social history. Since the 1990s, however, the field has been aging and has had much less attraction to younger scholars.

=== Claims for urban impact ===
Historian Richard Wade summarizes the claims that scholars have made for the importance of the city in American history. The cities were the focal points for the growth of the West, especially those along the Ohio and Mississippi rivers. The cities, especially Boston, were the seed beds of the American Revolution. Rivalry between cities, such as between Baltimore and Philadelphia, or between Chicago and St. Louis, stimulated economic innovations and growth, especially regarding the railroads. The cities sponsored entrepreneurship, especially in terms of export and import markets, banking, finance, and the rise of the factory system after 1812. The rapidly growing railroad system after 1840 was primarily oriented toward linking together the major cities, which in turn became centers of the wholesale trade. The railroads allowed major cities such as Atlanta, Chicago, Minneapolis, Denver, and San Francisco to dominate ever-larger hinterlands.

The failure of the South to develop an urban infrastructure significantly weakened it during the Civil War, especially as its border cities of Baltimore, Washington, Louisville, and St. Louis refused to join the Confederacy. The cities were fonts of innovation in democracy, especially in terms of building powerful political organizations and machines; they were also the main base for reformers of those machines. They became the home base for important immigrant groups, especially the Irish and the Jews. Cities were the strongholds of labor unions in the 19th and 20th centuries (although no longer so in the 21st century).

Historian Zane Miller argues that urban history was rejuvenated in mid-20th century by the realization that the cultural importance of the city went far beyond art galleries and museums. Historians began to emphasize "the importance of individual choices in the past and made the advocacy of lifestyle choices a hallmark of American civilization." It was the diversity of the city, and the support it provided for diverse lifestyles, that set it so dramatically apart from towns and rural areas. By the 1990s there was increased emphasis on racial minorities, outcasts, and gays and lesbians, as well as studies of leisure activities and sports history.

=== Intellectuals against the city ===
As Morton White demonstrates in The Intellectual versus the City: from Thomas Jefferson to Frank Lloyd Wright (1962), the overwhelming consensus of American intellectuals has been hostile to the city. The main idea is the Romantic view that the unspoiled nature of rural America is morally superior over civilized cities, which are the natural homes of sharpsters and criminals. American poets did not rhapsodize over the cities. On the contrary they portrayed the metropolis as the ugly scene of economic inequality, crime, drunkenness, prostitution and every variety of immorality. Urbanites were set to rhyme as crafty, overly competitive, artificial, and as having lost too much naturalness and goodness.

== Colonial era and American Revolution ==
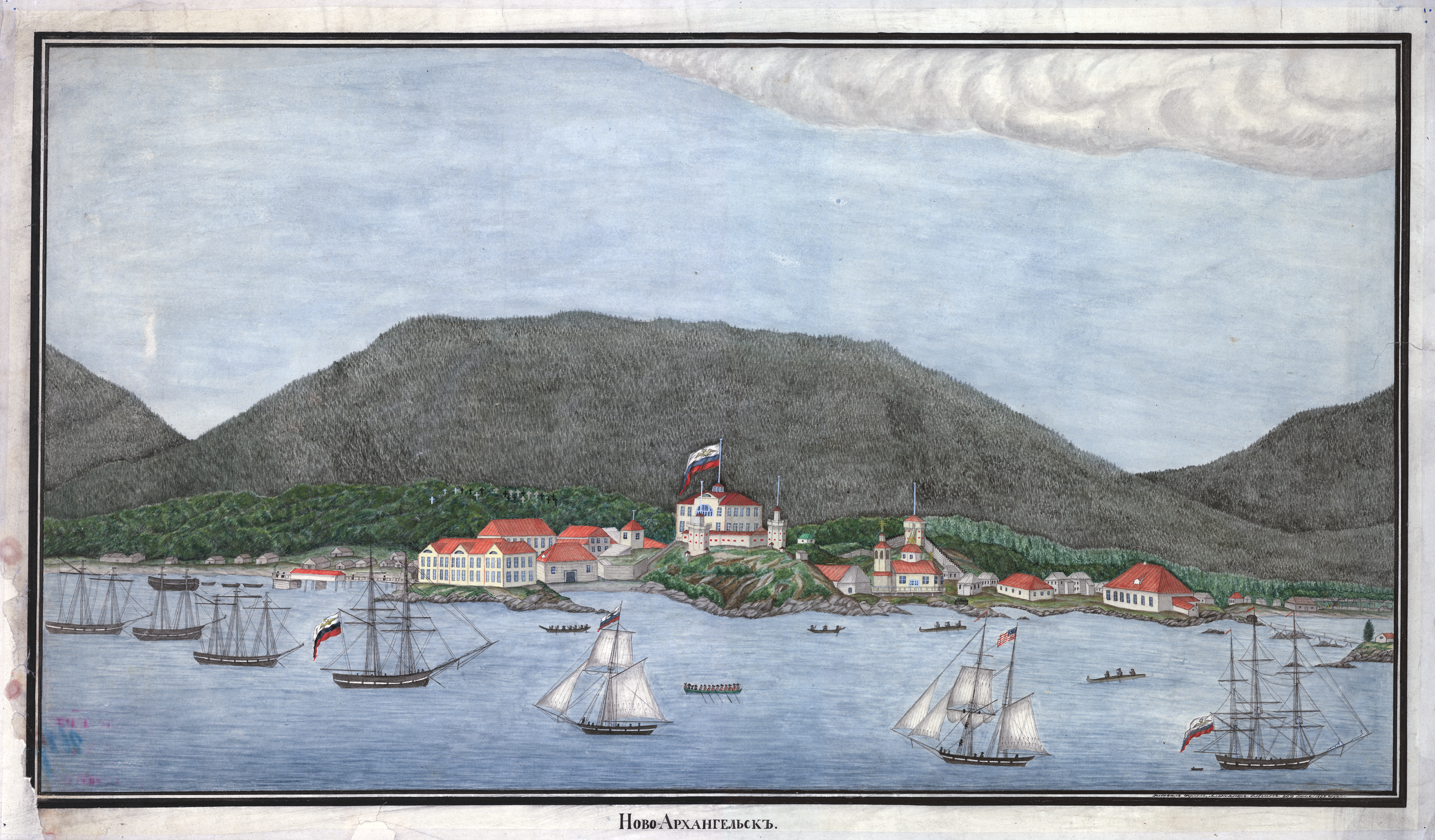
The capital of the Russian-American Company at New Archangel, present day Sitka, Alaska, 1837

Historian Carl Bridenbaugh examined in depth five key cities: Boston (population 16,000 in 1760); Newport, Rhode Island (population 7,500); New York City (population 18,000), Philadelphia (population 23,000); and Charles Town (Charleston, South Carolina, population 8,000). He argues they grew from small villages to take major leadership roles in promoting trade, land speculation, immigration, and prosperity, in disseminating the ideas of the Enlightenment, and new methods in medicine and technology. They sponsored a consumer taste for English amenities, developed a distinctly American educational system, and began systems for care of people needing welfare.

The cities were not remarkable by European standards, but they did display certain distinctly American characteristics, according to Bridenbaugh. There was no aristocracy or established church; there was no long tradition of powerful guilds. The colonial governments were much less powerful and intrusive than corresponding national governments in Europe. They experimented with new methods to raise revenue, build infrastructure and to solve urban problems.

They were more democratic than European cities, in that a large fraction of the men could vote, and class lines were more fluid. Contrasted to Europe, printers (especially as newspaper editors) had a much larger role in shaping public opinion, and lawyers moved easily back and forth between politics and their profession. Bridenbaugh argues that by the mid-18th century, the middle-class businessmen, professionals, and skilled artisans dominated the cities. He characterizes them as "sensible, shrewd, frugal, ostentatiously moral, generally honest," public spirited, and upwardly mobile, and argues their economic strivings led to "democratic yearnings" for political power.

Colonial powers established villages of a few hundred population as administrative centers, providing a governmental presence, as well has trading opportunities, and some transportation facilities. Representative examples include Spanish towns of Santa Fe, New Mexico, San Antonio, and Los Angeles; French towns of New Orleans and Detroit; Dutch towns of New Amsterdam (New York City), and the Russian town of New Archangel (now Sitka, Alaska). When their territories were absorbed into the United States, these towns expanded their administrative roles. Numerous historians have explored the roles of working-class men, including slaves, in the economy of the colonial cities and in the early republic.

There were few cities in the entire South, and Charles Town and New Orleans were the most important before the Civil War. The Province of South Carolina was settled mainly by planters from the overpopulated sugar island colony of Barbados, who brought large numbers of African slaves from that island. As Charles Town grew as a port for the shipment of rice and later cotton, so did the community's cultural and social opportunities. The city had a large base of elite merchants and rich planters.

The first theater building in America was built in Charlestown in 1736 but was later replaced by the 19th-century Planter's Hotel where wealthy planters stayed during Charleston's horse-racing season, now the Dock Street Theatre, known as one of the oldest active theaters built for stage performance in the United States. Benevolent societies were formed by several different ethnic groups: the South Carolina Society, founded by French Huguenots in 1737, the German Friendly Society, founded in 1766, and the Hibernian Society, founded by Irish immigrants in 1801. The Charleston Library Society was established in 1748 by some wealthy Charlestonians who wished to keep up with the scientific and philosophical issues of the day. This group also helped establish the College of Charleston in 1770, the oldest college in South Carolina, the oldest municipal college in the United States, and the 13th oldest college in the United States.

By 1775 the largest city was Philadelphia at 40,000, followed by New York (25,000), Boston (16,000), Charleston (12,000), and Newport (11,000), along with Baltimore (6,000), Norfolk (6,000), and Providence (4,400). They too were all seaports, and on any one day each hosted a large transient population of sailors and visiting businessmen. On the eve of the American Revolution, 95 percent of the American population lived outside the cities—much to the frustration of the British, who were able to capture the cities with their Royal Navy but lacked the manpower to occupy and subdue the countryside. In explaining the importance of the cities in shaping the American Revolution, Benjamin Carp compares the important role of waterfront workers, taverns, churches, kinship networks, and local politics.

Historian Gary B. Nash emphasizes the role of the working class and their distrust of their betters in northern ports. He argues that working class artisans and skilled craftsmen made up a radical element in Philadelphia that took control of the city starting about 1770 and promoted a radical democratic form of government during the Revolution. They held power for a while and used their control of the local militia to disseminate their ideology to the working class and to stay in power until the businessmen staged a conservative counterrevolution.

== New nation, 1783–1815 ==
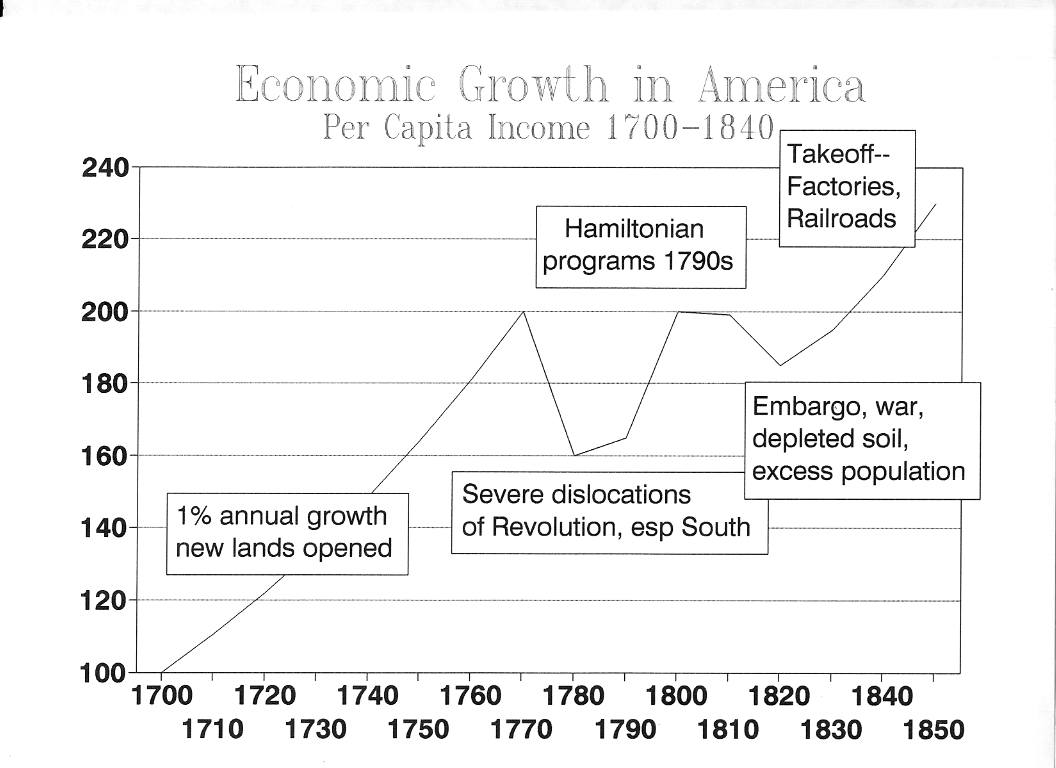
Trends in economic growth, 1700–1850

The cities played a major role in fomenting the American Revolution, but they were hard hit during the war itself, 1775–83. They lost their main role as oceanic ports, because of the blockade by the British Navy. Furthermore, the British occupied the cities, especially New York 1776–83, as well as Boston, Philadelphia and Charlestown for briefer periods. During the occupations cities were cut off from their hinterland trade and from overland communication. The British departed in 1783, they took out large numbers of wealthy merchants, resuming their business activities elsewhere in the British Empire.

The older cities restored their economic basis. Growing cities included Salem, Massachusetts (which opened a new trade with China), New London, Connecticut, and especially Baltimore. The Washington administration under the leadership of Secretary of the Treasury Alexander Hamilton set up a national bank in 1791, and local banks began to flourish in all the cities. Merchant entrepreneurship flourished and was a powerful engine of prosperity in the cities.

Merchants and financiers of the cities were especially sensitive to the weakness of the old Confederation system. When it came time to ratify the much stronger new Constitution in 1788, all the nation's cities, North and South, voted in favor, while the rural districts were divided. The national capital was at Philadelphia until 1800, when it was moved to Washington. Apart from the yellow fever epidemic of 1793, which killed about 10 percent of the population, Philadelphia had a reputation as the "cleanest, best-governed, healthiest, and most elegant of American cities." Washington, built in a fever-ridden swamp with long hot miserable summers, was ranked far behind Philadelphia, although it did escape yellow fever.

In 1793 a two-decade-long war between Britain and France and their allies broke out. As the leading neutral trading partner, the United States did business with both sides. France resented it, and the Quasi-War of 1798–99 disrupted trade. Outraged at British impositions on American merchant ships and sailors, the Jefferson and Madison administrations engaged in economic warfare with Britain 1807–1812 and then full-scale warfare 1812 to 1815. The result was additional serious damage to the mercantile interests.

Not all was gloomy in urban history, however. Although there was relatively little immigration from Europe, the rapid expansion of settlements to the West, and the Louisiana Purchase of 1803, open up vast frontier lands. New Orleans and St. Louis joined the United States, and entirely new cities were opened in Pittsburgh, Cincinnati, Nashville and points west. Historian Richard Wade emphasizes the importance of the new cities in the Westward expansion in settlement of the farmlands. They were the transportation centers and nodes for migration and financing of the westward expansion.

The newly opened regions had few roads but a very good river system in which everything flowed downstream to New Orleans. With the coming of the steamboat after 1820, it became possible to move merchandise imported from the Northeast and from Europe upstream to new settlements. The opening of the Erie Canal made Buffalo, New York, the jumping off point for the Great Lakes system that made important cities out of Cleveland, Detroit, and especially Chicago.

== First stage of rapid urban growth, 1815–1860 ==
| City | 1820 | 1840 | 1860 |
|---|---|---|---|
| Boston and its suburbs | 63,000 | 124,000 | 289,000 |
| New York | 152,000 | 391,000 | 1,175,000 |
| Philadelphia | 137,000 | 258,000 | 566,000 |

New York—with a population of 96,000 in 1810—surged far beyond its rivals, reaching a population of 1,080,000 in 1860, compared to 566,000 in Philadelphia, 212,000 in Baltimore, 178,000 in Boston (289,000 including the Boston suburbs), and 169,000 in New Orleans. Historian Robert Albion identifies four aggressive moves by New York entrepreneurs and politicians that helped it jump to the top of American cities. It set up an auction system that efficiently and rapidly sold imported cargoes; it organized a regular transatlantic packet service to England; it built a large-scale coastwise trade, especially one that brought southern cotton to New York for export to Europe; it sponsored the Erie Canal, which opened a large new market in upstate New York and the Old Northwest.

The main rivals—Boston, Philadelphia, and Baltimore—tried to compete with the Erie Canal by opening their own networks of canals and railroads; they never caught up. Manufacturing was not a major factor in the growth of the largest cities at this point. Instead factories were chiefly being built in towns and smaller cities, especially in New England, having waterfalls or fast rivers that were harnessed to generate the power, or were closer to coal supplies as in Pennsylvania.

=== National leadership ===
America's financial, business and cultural leadership—that is, literature, the arts, and the media—were concentrated in the three or four largest cities. Political leadership was never concentrated; it was divided between Washington and the state capitals, and many states deliberately moved their state capital out of their largest city, including New York, Pennsylvania, Michigan, Illinois, Missouri, South Carolina, Louisiana, Texas and California.

Academic and scientific leadership was weak until the late 19th century, when it began to be concentrated in universities. A few major research-oriented schools were in or close by the largest cities, such as Harvard (Boston), Columbia (New York), University of Pennsylvania (Philadelphia), and Johns Hopkins (Baltimore). However, most were located in smaller cities or large towns such as Yale; Cornell; Princeton; the University of Michigan; University of Illinois Urbana-Champaign; University of Wisconsin–Madison; University of California, Berkeley, and Stanford.

== Civil War ==
The cities played a major part in the Civil War, providing soldiers, money, training camps, supplies, and media support for the Union war effort. In the North, discontent with the 1863 draft law led to riots in several cities and in rural areas as well. By far the most important were the New York City draft riots of July 13 to July 16, 1863. Irish Catholic and other workers fought police, militia and regular army units until the Army used artillery to sweep the streets. Initially focused on the draft, the protests quickly expanded into violent attacks on blacks in New York City, with many killed on the streets.

A study of the small Michigan cities of Grand Rapids and Niles shows an overwhelming surge of nationalism in 1861, whipping up enthusiasm for the war in all segments of society, and all political, religious, ethnic, and occupational groups. However, by 1862 the casualties were mounting and the war was increasingly focused on freeing the slaves in addition to preserving the Union. Copperhead Democrats called the war a failure, and it became more and more a partisan Republican effort.

=== Confederacy ===
Cities played a much less important part in the heavily rural Confederacy. When the war started, the largest cities in slave states were seized in 1861 by the Union, including Washington, Baltimore, Wheeling, Louisville, and St. Louis. New Orleans (the largest and most important Confederate city) and Nashville were captured in early 1862. All these cities became major logistic and strategic centers for the Union forces. All the remaining ports were blockaded by the summer of 1861, ending normal commercial traffic, with only very expensive blockade runners getting through. The largest remaining cities were Atlanta and Richmond.

The overall decline in food supplies, made worse by the inadequate transportation system, led to serious shortages and high prices in Confederate cities. When bacon reached one dollar per pound in 1864, the poor white women of Richmond, Atlanta, and many other cities began to riot; they broke into shops and warehouses to seize food. The women expressed their anger at ineffective state relief efforts, speculators, merchants and planters.

The 11 Confederate states in 1860 had 297 towns and cities with 835,000 people. Of these, 162 towns and cities with 681,000 people were at one point occupied by Union forces. Eleven were destroyed or severely damaged by war action, including Atlanta (with an 1860 population of 9,600), Charleston, Columbia, and Richmond (with prewar populations of 40,500, 8,100, and 37,900, respectively). The 11 cities contained 115,900 people in the 1860 census, or 14% of the urban South. The number of people as of 1860 who lived in the destroyed towns represented just over 1% of the Confederacy's 1860 population.

== Late 19th century growth ==
=== Street traffic ===
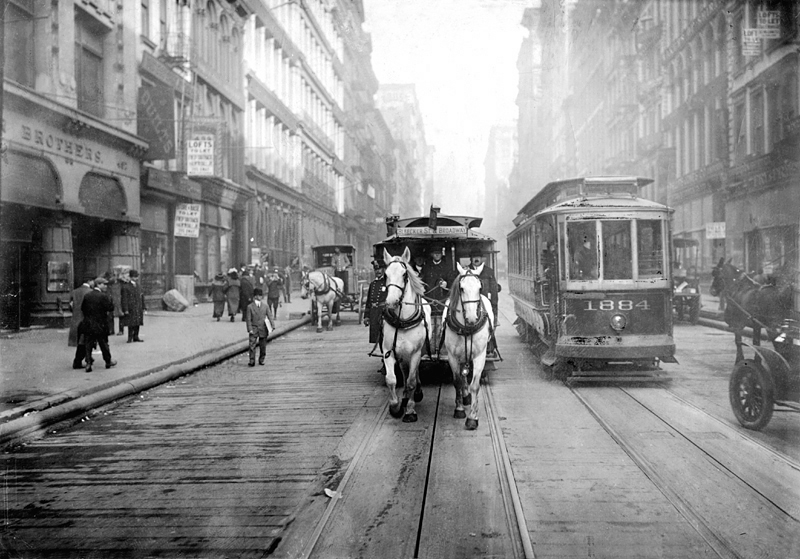
Horse-drawn trams continued to be used in New York City until 1917.

In a horse-drawn era, streets were unpaved and covered with dirt or gravel. However, they produced uneven wear, opened new hazards for pedestrians and made for dangerous potholes for bicycles and for motor vehicles. Manhattan alone had 130,000 horses in 1900, pulling streetcars, wagons, and carriages, and leaving their waste behind. They were not fast, and pedestrians could dodge and scramble their way across the crowded streets. Small towns continued to rely on dirt and gravel, but larger cities wanted much better streets, so they looked to wood or granite blocks.

In 1890, a third of Chicago's 2,000 miles of streets were paved, chiefly with wooden blocks, which gave better traction than mud. Brick surfacing was a good compromise, but even better was asphalt paving. With London and Paris as models, Washington laid 400,000 square yards of asphalt paving by 1882, serving as a model for Buffalo, Philadelphia and elsewhere. By the end of the century, American cities boasted 30 million square yards of asphalt paving, followed by brick construction.

In the largest cities, street railways were elevated, which increased their speed and lessened their dangers. Street-level trolleys moved passengers at 12 miles per hour for 5 cents per ride, with free transfers. They became the main transportation service for middle class shoppers and office workers until automobiles became more popular after 1945.

The working-class typically walked to nearby factories and patronized small local stores. Big-city streets became paths for faster and larger and more dangerous vehicles, the pedestrians beware. Underground subways were a solution, with Boston building one in the 1890s followed by New York a decade later.

=== Western United States ===
After 1860, railroads pushed westward into unsettled territory. They built service towns to handle the needs of railroad construction and repair crews, train crews, and passengers who ate meals at scheduled stops. Gunfights and disorder characterized the railhead towns that were the target of major cattle drives from Texas. The violence was often exaggerated in dime novels. In most of the South, there were very few cities of any size for miles around, and this held for Texas as well. Railroads arrived in the 1880s, and they shipped the cattle out; cattle drives became short-distance affairs. However the passenger trains were often the targets of armed gangs.

Denver's economy before 1870 had been rooted in mining. It then grew by expanding its role in railroads, wholesale trade, manufacturing, food processing, and servicing the growing agricultural and ranching hinterland. Between 1870 and 1890, manufacturing output soared from $600,000 to $40 million, and the population grew by a factor of 20 times to 107,000. Denver had always attracted miners, workers, whores and travelers. Saloons and gambling dens sprung up overnight. The city fathers boasted of its fine theaters, and especially the Tabor Grand Opera House built in 1881. By 1890, Denver had grown to be the 26th largest city in America and the fifth-largest city west of the Mississippi River. The boom times attracted millionaires and their mansions, as well as hustlers, poverty and crime. Denver gained regional notoriety with its range of bawdy houses, from the sumptuous quarters of renowned madams to the squalid "cribs" located a few blocks away. Business was good; visitors spent lavishly, then left town. As long as madams conducted their business discreetly, and "crib girls" did not advertise their availability too crudely, authorities took their bribes and looked the other way. Occasional cleanups and crack downs satisfied the demands for reform.

With its giant mountain of copper, Butte, Montana, was the largest, richest and rowdiest mining camp on the frontier. It was an ethnic stronghold, with the Irish Catholics in control of politics and of the best jobs at the leading mining corporation Anaconda Copper. City boosters opened a public library in 1894. Ring argues that the library was originally a mechanism of social control, "an antidote to the miners' proclivity for drinking, whoring, and gambling." It was also designed to promote middle-class values and to convince Easterners the Butte was a cultivated city. Appreciative crowds filled the large, upscale "Belasco" opera house for full-scale operas and top-name artists.

=== Skyscrapers and apartment buildings ===
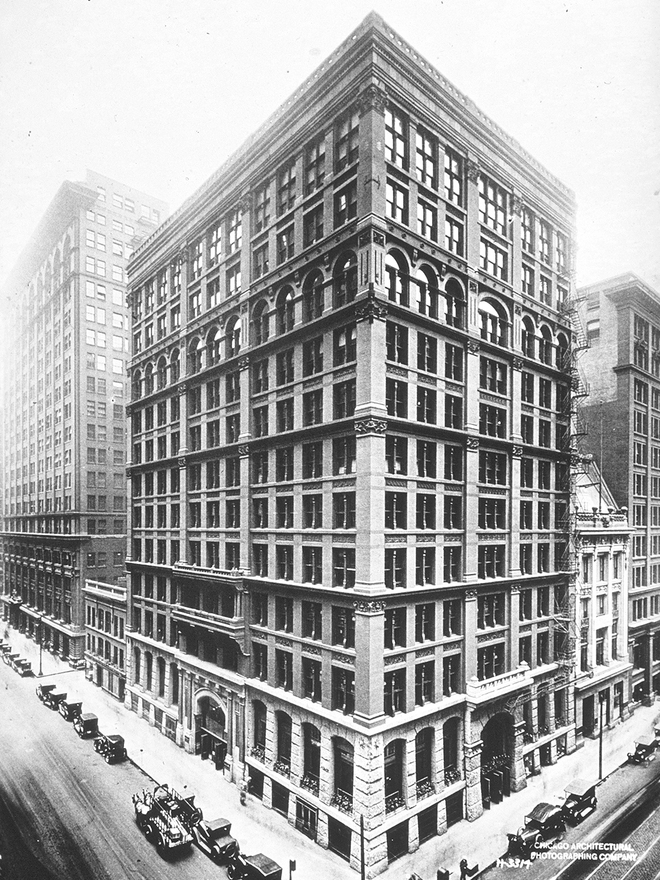
Chicago's Home Insurance Building, often considered the world's first skyscraper, was completed in 1885

In Chicago and New York, inventions facilitated the emergence of the skyscraper in the 1880s—it was a characteristic American style that was not widely copied around the world until the late 20th century. Construction required several major innovations, including the elevator and the steel beam. The steel skeleton, developed in the 1880s, replaced the heavy brick walls that were limited to 15 or so stories in height. The skyscraper also required a complex internal structure to solve difficult issues of ventilation, steam heat, gas lighting (and later electricity), and plumbing. Urban housing involved a wide variety of styles, but most of the attention focused on the tenement house for the working class and the apartment building for the middle class.

The apartment building came first, as middle-class professionals, businessmen, and white-collar workers realized they did not need and could scarcely afford single-family dwellings of the type that low land costs in the towns permitted. Boarding houses were inappropriate for family; hotel suites were too expensive. In smaller cities, there were many apartments over stores and shops, usually occupied by proprietors of small local businesses. The residents paid rent and did not own their apartments until the emergence of cooperatives in New York City in the 20th century and condominiums around the country after World War II. Turnover was very high, and there was seldom was a sense of neighborhood community.

Starting with the Stuyvesant luxury apartment house that opened in New York in 1869, and The Dakota in 1884, affluent tenants discovered that full-time staff handled the upkeep and maintenance, as well as security. The less-lavish middle-class apartment buildings provided gas lighting, elevators, good plumbing, central heating, and maintenance men on call. Boston contractors built 16,000 "Triple-Deckers" Between 1870 and 1920. They were modern well-equipped buildings with a single large apartment on each floor. Chicago built thousands of apartment buildings, with the upscale ones close to Lake Michigan, where it was warmer in the winter and cooler in the summer. In every city, apartment buildings were built along the paths of the street railways, for the middle-class tenants rode the streetcar to work, while the working class saved a nickel each way and walked.

The working class crowded into tenement houses, with far fewer features and amenities. They were cheap and easy to build, and they filled up almost the entire lot. There were typically five story walk-ups, with four separate apartments on each floor. There was minimal air circulation and sunlight. Until the reforms of 1879, New York tenements lacked running water or indoor toilets. Garbage pickup was erratic until late in the 19th century. Rents were cheap for those who could endure the dust, clutter, smells and noises; the only cheaper alternatives were squalid basement rooms in older buildings. Most of the tenements survived until the urban renewal movement of the 1950s.

=== Lure of the metropolis ===
Jeffersonian America distrusted the city, and rural spokesmen repeatedly warned their young men away. In 1881 The Evening Wisconsin newspaper warned cautious boys to stay on the farm. As paraphrased by historian Bayrd Still, the editor paints a grim contrast:

Pure milk, wholesome water, mellow fruit, vegetables, and proper sleep and exercise are lacking in the city; and the "dense centers of population are unfavorable to moral growth as they are to physical development." Sharpness and deception characterize the city merchant, mechanic, and professional man as well. How different is the situation of the "sturdy farmer removed from the dust and smoke and filth and vice of the crowded city. ... Content in his cottage ... why should he long for the fare and follies of the madding crowd in the Gay Metropolis?

The response came from a Milwaukee newspaper editor in 1871, who boasts that the ambitious young man could not be stopped:

The young man in the country no sooner elects for himself his course, than he makes for the nearest town. Scarcely has he grown familiar with his new surroundings, when the subtle attractions of the remoter city begin to tell upon him. There is no resisting it. It draws him like a magnet. Sooner or later, it is tolerably certain, he will be sucked into one of the great centers of life.

=== Reformers ===
Historians have developed an elaborate typology of reformers in the late 19th century, focusing especially on the urban reformers. The Mugwumps were reform-minded Republicans who acted at the national level in the 1870s and 1880s, especially in 1884 when they split their ticket for Democrat Grover Cleveland. The "goo-goos" were the local equivalent: the middle-class reformers who sought "good government" regardless of party. They typically focused on urban sanitation, better schools, and lower trolley fares for the middle-class commuters. They especially demanded a nonpolitical civil service system to replace the "spoils of victory" approach by which the winners of an election replaced city and school employees. They often formed short-lived citywide organizations, such as The Committee of 70 in New York, the Citizens' Reform Association in Philadelphia, the Citizens' Association of Chicago, and the Baltimore Reform League. They sometimes won citywide elections but were rarely reelected. Party regulars laughed at them for trying to be independent of the political party machines by forming nonpartisan tickets. The ridicule included suggestions that the reformers were not real men: they were sissies and "mollycoddles".

By the 1890s, what historians call "structural reformers" were emerging; they were much more successful at reform and marked the beginning of the Progressive Era. They used national organizations such as the National Municipal League and focused on broader principles such as honesty, efficiency, economy, and centralized decision-making by experts. "Efficiency" was their watchword; they believed one of the problems with the machines was that they wasted enormous amounts of tax money by creating useless patronage jobs and payoffs to mid-level politicians.

Social reformers emerged in the 1890s, most famously Jane Addams and the large complex network of reformers based at Hull House in Chicago. They were less interested in civil service reform or revising the city charter and concentrated instead on the needs of working class housing, child labor, sanitation and welfare. Protestant churches promoted their own group of reformers, mostly women activists demanding prohibition or sharp reductions in the baleful influence of the saloon in damaging family finances and causing family violence.

Rural America was increasingly won over by the prohibitionists, but they rarely had success in the larger cities, where they were staunchly opposed by the large German and Irish elements. However, the Woman's Christian Temperance Union (WCTU) became well organized in cities and taught middle-class women the techniques of organization, proselytizing, and propaganda. Many of the WCTU veterans graduated into the women's suffrage movement.

School reform was high on the agenda, since local machine politicians used the jobs in the contracts to promote the party interest rather than the needs of the students. After examining late 19th century reform movements in New York, Philadelphia, St. Louis, San Francisco and Chicago, historian David Tyack concludes "what the structural reformers wanted to do, then, was to replace a rather mechanical form of public bureaucracy, which was permeated with 'illegitimate' lay influence, with a streamlined 'professional' bureaucracy in which lay control was carefully filtered through a corporate school board.

=== Sanitation and public health ===
Sanitary conditions were bad throughout urban America in the 19th century. The worst conditions appeared in the largest cities, where the accumulation of human and horse waste built up on the city streets, where sewage systems were inadequate and the water supply was of dubious quality.

Physicians took the lead in pointing out problems and were of two minds on the causes. The older theory of contagion said that germs spread disease, but this theory was increasingly out of fashion by the 1840s or 1850s for two reasons. On the one hand it predicted too much— microscopes demonstrated so many various microorganisms that there was no particular reason to associate any one of them with a specific disease. There was also a political dimension; a contagious theory of disease called for aggressive public health measures, which meant taxes and regulation the business community rejected.

Before the 1880s, most experts believed in the "miasma theory" which attributed the spread of disease to "bad air" caused by the abundance of dirt and animal waste. It indicated the need for regular garbage pickup. By the 1880s, European discovery of the germ theory of disease proved decisive for the medical community, although popular belief did not abandon the old "bad air" theory. Medical attention shifted from curing the sick patient to stopping the spread of the disease in the first place. It indicated a system of quarantines, hospitalization, clean water, and proper sewage disposal.

Dr Charles V. Chapin, head of public health in Providence, Rhode Island, was a tireless campaigner for the germ theory of disease, which he repeatedly validated with his laboratory studies. Chapin told popular audiences germs were the true culprit, not filth; that diseases were not indiscriminately transmitted through the smelly air; and that disinfection was not a cure-all. He paid little attention to environmental or chemical hazards in the air and water, or to tobacco smoking, since germs were not involved.

The second stage of public health, building on the germ theory, brought in engineers to design elaborate water and sewer systems. Their expertise was welcomed, and many became city managers after that reform was introduced in the early 20th century.

== 20th century ==
In the era 1890–1930, the larger cities were the focus of national attention. The skyscrapers and tourist attractions were widely publicized. Suburbs existed, but they were largely bedroom communities for commuters to the central city. San Francisco dominated the West, Atlanta dominated the South, Boston dominated New England. Chicago, the nation's railroad hub, dominated the Midwest, New York City dominated the entire nation in terms of communications, trade, finance, as well as popular culture and high culture. More than a fourth of the 300 largest corporations in 1920 were headquartered in New York City.

=== Progressive Era: 1890s–1920s ===
During the Progressive Era a coalition of middle-class reform-oriented voters, academic experts and reformers hostile to the political machines introduced a series of reforms in urban America, designed to reduce waste and inefficiency and corruption, by introducing scientific methods, compulsory education and administrative innovations. The pace was set in Detroit, Michigan, where Republican Mayor Hazen S. Pingree first put together the reform coalition.

Many cities set up municipal reference bureaus to study the budgets and administrative structures of local governments. Progressive mayors were important in many cities, such as Cleveland (especially Mayor Tom L. Johnson); Toledo, Ohio; Jersey City, New Jersey; Los Angeles; Memphis, Tennessee; Louisville, Kentucky; and many other cities, especially in the western states. In Illinois, Governor Frank Lowden undertook a major reorganization of state government. Wisconsin was the stronghold of Robert La Follette, who led a wing of the Republican Party. His Wisconsin Idea used the state university as a major source of ideas and expertise.

One of the most dramatic changes came in Galveston, Texas, where a devastating hurricane and flood overwhelmed the resources of local government. Reformers abolished political parties in municipal elections and set up a five-man commission of experts to rebuild the city. The Galveston idea was simple, efficient, and much less conducive to corruption. It lessened the democratic influences of the average voter but multiplied the influence of the reform-minded middle class. The Galveston plan was copied by many other cities, especially in the West. By 1914 over 400 cities had nonpartisan elected commissions. Dayton, Ohio, had its Great Flood in 1913 and responded with the innovation of a paid, non-political city manager, hired by the commissioners to run the bureaucracy; civil engineers were especially preferred.

=== Urban planning ===
The garden city movement was brought over from England and evolved into the "neighborhood unit" form of development. In the early 20th century, as cars were introduced to city streets, residents became increasingly concerned with the number of pedestrians being injured by car traffic. The response, seen first in Radburn, New Jersey, was the neighborhood unit-style development, which oriented houses toward a common public path instead of the street.

=== Great Depression ===
Urban America had enjoyed strong growth and steady prosperity in the 1920s. Large-scale immigration had ended in 1914 and never fully resumed, so that ethnic communities have become stabilized and Americanized. Upward mobility was the norm, in every sector of the population supported the rapidly growing high school system. After the stock market crash of October 1929, the nation's optimism suddenly turned negative, with both business investments and private consumption overwhelmed by a deepening pessimism that encouraged people to cut back and reduce their expectations. The economic damage to the cities was most serious in the collapse of 80 to 90 percent of the private sector construction industry. Cities and states started expanding their own construction programs as early as 1930, and they became a central feature of the New Deal, but private construction did not fully recover until after 1945. Many landlords saw their rental income drained away, and many went bankrupt. Manufacturing of durable goods such as automobiles, machinery, and refrigerators, also took a major downturn. The impact of unemployment was higher in the manufacturing centers in the East and Midwest and lower in the South and West, which had less manufacturing.

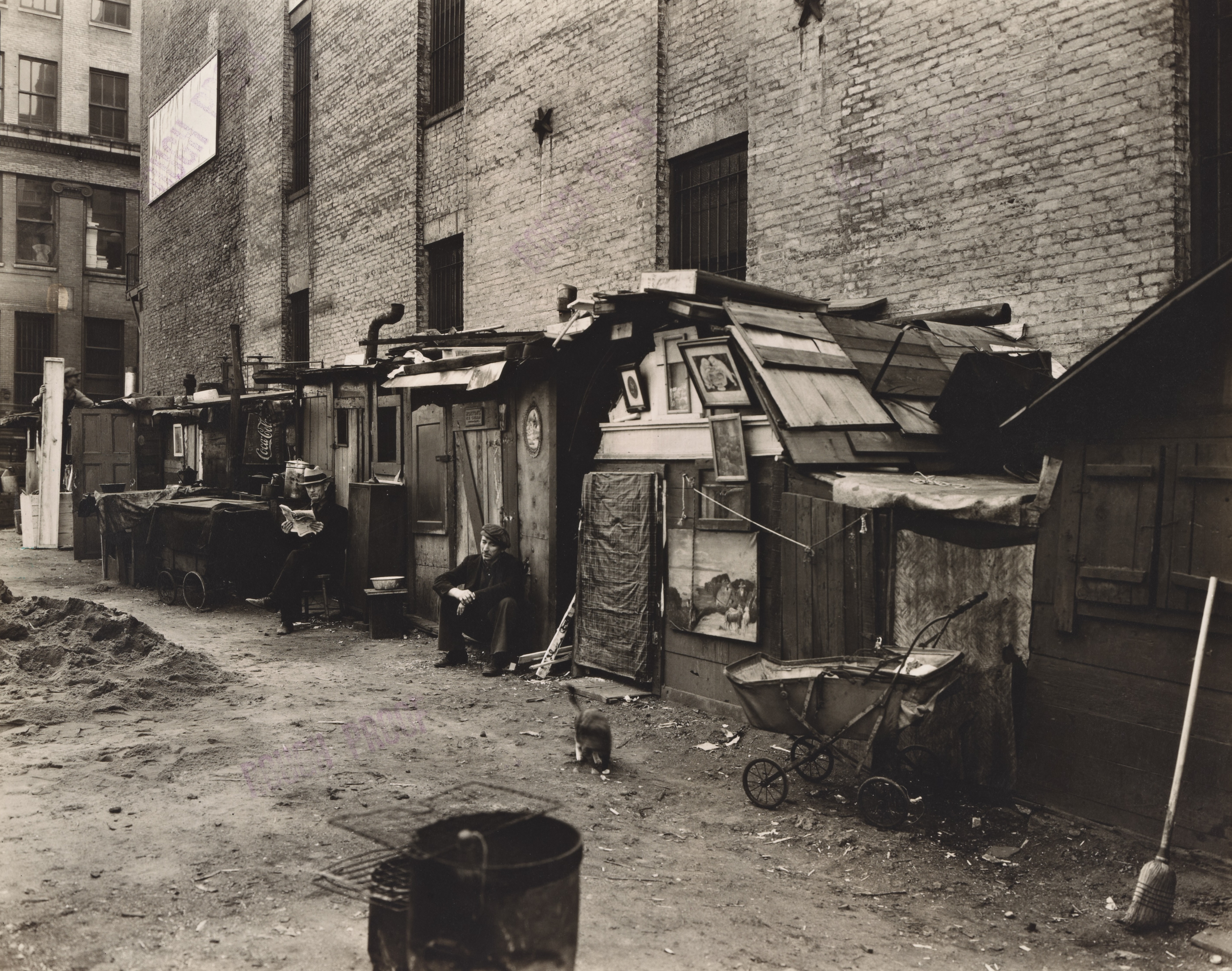
Huts and unemployed men in New York City, 1935.

One visible effect of the depression was the advent of Hoovervilles, which were ramshackle assemblages on vacant lots of cardboard boxes, tents, and small rickety wooden sheds built by homeless people. Residents lived in shacks and begged for food or went to soup kitchens. The term was coined by Charles Michelson, publicity chief of the Democratic National Committee, who referred sardonically to President Herbert Hoover whose policies he blamed for the depression.

Unemployment reached 25 percent in the worst days of 1932–33, but it was unevenly distributed. Job losses were less severe among women than men, among workers in nondurable industries, such as food and clothing, in services and sales, and in government jobs. The least skilled inner city men had much higher unemployment rates, as did young people who had a hard time getting their first job, and men over age 45 who if they lost their job would seldom find another one because employers had their choice of younger men. Millions were hired in the Great Depression, but men with weaker credentials were never hired and fell into a long-term unemployment trap. The migration that brought millions of farmers and townspeople to the bigger cities in the 1920s was suddenly reversed as unemployment made the cities unattractive, and the network of kinfolk and more ample food supplies made it wise for many to go back to rural America.

City governments in 1930–31 tried to meet the depression by expanding public works projects, as President Hoover strongly encouraged. However, tax revenues were plunging, and the cities as well as private relief agencies were totally overwhelmed; by 1931 men were unable to provide significant additional relief. They fell back on the cheapest possible relief: soup kitchens which provided free meals for anyone who showed up. After 1933 new sales taxes and infusions of federal money helped relieve the fiscal distress of the cities, but the budgets did not fully recover until 1941.

The federal programs launched by Hoover and greatly expanded by President Franklin D. Roosevelt's New Deal used massive construction projects to try to jump start the economy and solve the unemployment crisis. The alphabet agencies built and repaired the public infrastructure in dramatic fashion but did little to foster the recovery of the private sector. FERA, CCC and especially WPA focused on providing unskilled jobs for long-term unemployed men.

The Democrats won landslides in 1932, 1934, and 1936. The hapless Republican Party seemed doomed. The Democrats capitalized on the magnetic appeal of Roosevelt to urban America. The key groups were low-skilled ethnics, especially Catholics, Jews, and blacks. The Democrats promised and delivered in terms of beer, political recognition, labor union membership, and relief jobs. The city machines were stronger than ever, as they mobilized their precinct workers to help families navigate the bureaucracy and get relief. Roosevelt won the vote of practically every group in 1936, including taxpayers, small business and the middle class. However the Protestant middle class voters turned sharply against him after the recession of 1937–1938 undermined repeated promises that recovery was at hand. Historically, local political machines were primarily interested in controlling their wards and citywide elections. The smaller the turnout on election day, the easier it was to control the system. However, for Roosevelt to win the presidency in 1936 and 1940, he needed to carry the electoral college, and that meant he needed the largest possible majorities in the cities to overwhelm the out state vote. The machines came through for him.

The 3.5 million voters on relief payrolls during the 1936 election cast 82% percent of their ballots for Roosevelt. The rapidly growing, energetic labor unions, chiefly based in the cities, turned out 80% for Roosevelt, as did Irish, Italian and Jewish communities. In all, the nation's 106 cities over 100,000 population voted 70% for Roosevelt in 1936, compared to his 59% elsewhere. Roosevelt worked very well with the big city machines, with the one exception of his old nemesis, Tammany Hall in Manhattan. There he supported the complicated coalition built around the nominal Republican Fiorello La Guardia, and based on Jewish and Italian voters mobilized by labor unions.

In 1938, the Republicans made an unexpected comeback, and Roosevelt's efforts to purge the Democratic Party of his political opponents backfired badly. The conservative coalition of Northern Republicans and Southern Democrats took control of Congress, outvoted the urban liberals and ended the expansion of New Deal ideas. Roosevelt survived in 1940 thanks to his margin in the Solid South and in the cities. In the North the cities over 100,000 gave Roosevelt 60% of their votes, while the rest of the North favored Republican candidate Wendell Willkie 52%-48%.

With the start of full-scale war mobilization in the summer of 1940, the economies of the cities rebounded. Even before the attack on Pearl Harbor, Washington pumped massive investments into new factories and funded round-the-clock munitions production, guaranteeing a job to anyone who showed up at the factory gate. The war brought a restoration of prosperity and hopeful expectations for the future across the nation. It had the greatest impact on the cities of the West Coast, especially Los Angeles, San Diego, San Francisco, Portland and Seattle.

Economic historians led by Price Fishback have examined the impact of New Deal spending on improving health conditions in the 114 largest cities, 1929–1937. They estimate that every additional $153,000 in relief spending in 1935 dollars, or $1.95 million in year 2000 dollars, was associated with a reduction of one infant death, one suicide, and 2.4 deaths from infectious disease.

== 21st century ==
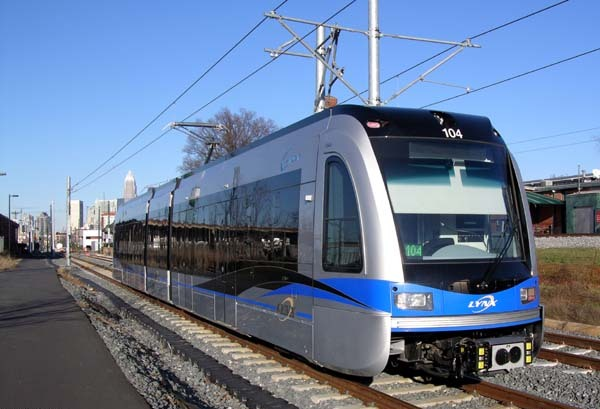
Many cities in the U.S. began adding more public transportation systems in the 21st century, such as the Lynx Blue Line that opened in 2007 in Charlotte, North Carolina

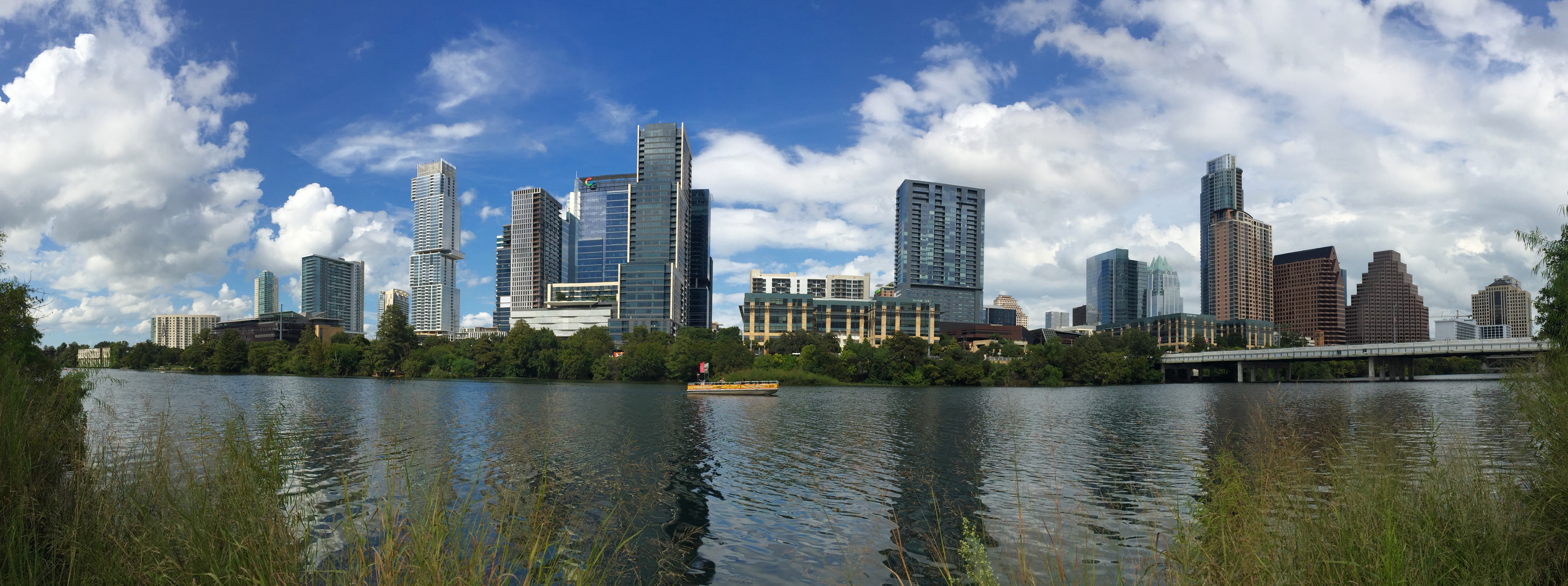
Austin, Texas, like other cities throughout the Southern and Western states, has boomed in recent years.

During the beginning of the 21st century, many cities in the South and West experienced significant growth in terms of population. This was trend that continued from the late 20th century where a lot of growth occurred in cities in the Sun Belt region. Texas in particular has experienced a tremendous amount of growth in the 21st century so far as the state with the largest population jump, with cities like Austin, San Antonio, Dallas, Fort Worth, Houston, and many of their suburbs constantly being ranked as the fastest-growing cities in the country.

Other cities in the South that have experienced significant population growth recently include Atlanta, Washington, Tampa, Orlando, Miami, Nashville, Charlotte, and Raleigh. Western cities have experienced lots of growth as well, with cities like Seattle, Phoenix, Riverside, Denver, Portland, and Las Vegas seeing a great influx of new residents. Smaller cities in the Southern and Western states have seen a large amount of population growth too, including Charleston, Myrtle Beach, Savannah, Cape Coral, Sarasota, Ogden, Colorado Springs, Boise, and more.

There are exceptions in the Southern and Western states though to this trend of cities having a large influx of new residents with places like Los Angeles, Memphis, Albuquerque, and Birmingham experiencing a slow growth in population, especially compared to other nearby areas. Some areas in the South and West have even seen population loss including Montgomery, Jackson, and parts of the San Francisco Bay Area like Marin County.

The San Francisco area, while overall still experiencing a decent population growth rate, has areas experiencing little to no growth and has more residents leaving than any other U.S. city due to the high cost of living in the region. Meanwhile, cities in the Rust Belt, such as Detroit, Cleveland, St. Louis, Buffalo, Pittsburgh, and Chicago, have experienced negative or stagnant growth in terms of population too. Many people from these locations are moving to the booming cities in the Southern and Western states.

Starting in the late 20th century and continuing into the 21st century, many cities across the country began creating new public transportation systems. After many public transportation systems, such as streetcars, were scrapped in cities starting in the 1950s, the automobile dominated America's urban transportation network. However, many cities, especially in the 21st century, have started creating new, rebuilding, or expanding public transportation systems to help combat problems like traffic congestion and air pollution from all of the commuting vehicles.

Many cities have added light rail systems, such as Phoenix's Valley Metro Rail or Charlotte's Lynx Blue Line. Other cities have heavily expanded their already existing transportation networks with new lines, such as the Expo Line in Los Angeles. Modern streetcars have been built in various cities across America recently as well, including the Atlanta Streetcar and the Dallas Streetcar. Some cities though have rebuilt their heritage streetcars in the 21st century, such as Tampa with its TECO Line Streetcar.

Commuter rail systems have been built in cities like Orlando's Sunrail or Seattle's Sounder Commuter Rail. Overall though, public transportation has been an important issue for 21st century American cities, and as a result there has been a large amount of focus on building or expanding various public transportation systems within urban areas.

== See also ==
- Environmental history of the United States
- History of Boston
- History of Chicago
- History of Cleveland
- History of Detroit
- History of Los Angeles
- History of New York City
- History of Philadelphia
- History of Pittsburgh
- Suburb
- Urban history
- Urbanism
- Local history: United States
- Category:Timelines of cities in the United States
