= Land of Hope and Glory (disambiguation) =

"Land of Hope and Glory" is a 1902 English song with music by Edward Elgar and lyrics by A. C. Benson.

Land of Hope and Glory may also refer to:

- Land of Hope and Glory (film), a 1927 British silent film
- "Land of Hope and Glory", a 1984 single by the Ex Pistols
- "Land of Hope and Glory", a song by the British band Madness from the 1979 album One Step Beyond...

== See also ==
- "Land of Hope and Dreams", a 1999 song by Bruce Springsteen
- Land of Hope and Gloria, a 1992 British sitcom
