= Encyclopedia of Chicago =

Historical reference on Chicago

- Cover of Encyclopedia of Chicago (2004)
- Author: James R. Grossman, Ann Durkin Keating, and Janice L. Reiff (all editors)
- Language: English
- Subject: History of Chicago
- Genre: Reference encyclopedia
- Publisher: University of Chicago Press
- Publication date: October 15, 2004 (print); May 11, 2005 (online)
- Publication place: United States
- Media type: hardbound/internet
- Pages: 1117
- ISBN: 0-226-31015-9
- OCLC: 54454572
- Dewey Decimal: 977.3/11/003 22
- LC Class: F548.3 .E53 2004
- Website: encyclopedia.chicagohistory.org

The Encyclopedia of Chicago is a historical reference work covering Chicago and the entire Chicago metropolitan area published by the University of Chicago Press. Released in October 2004, the work is the result of a ten-year collaboration between the Newberry Library and the Chicago Historical Society. It exists in both a hardcover print edition and an online format, known as the Electronic Encyclopedia of Chicago. The print edition is 1117 pages and includes 1400 entries, 2000 biographical sketches, 250 significant business enterprise descriptions, and hundreds of maps. Initially, the internet edition included 1766 entries, 1000 more images and sources.

The concept was fueled by other regional encyclopedias that had met with commercial success in 1980s and 1990s. Eventually, the vision to create the book found initial financing from the National Endowment for the Humanities. The book was well received and became a bestseller during the 2004 Christmas season following its October 2004 release. In May, 2005, the Electronic Encyclopedia of Chicago was released. Northwestern University joined the Newberry Library/Chicago Historical Society collaboration to publish the internet edition. The internet edition was the second of its kind for a U.S. city.

== Details ==
Individual entries were compiled by historians, graduate assistants and experts. Most contributors were professors. About 600 people contributed entries at a rate of $.10/per word. The contributors consulted reliable secondary sources, such as newspapers, to compile historical accounts. The book was edited by James R. Grossman, Ann Durkin Keating, and Janice L. Reiff. At the time, Grossman was the vice president for research and education at the Newberry Library and visiting professor of history at the University of Chicago. Keating was a professor of history at North Central College. Reiff was an associate professor of history at the University of California, Los Angeles.

Unlike resource compilation efforts for the cities that inspired this encyclopedia, the work was not bounded by the city limits. Instead, every suburb was provided an entry, as were each of Chicago's 77 official community areas. Entries ranged from 50 to 4000 words long. Eventually, the coverage of the subject matter expanded to include Southwest Michigan and Northwest Indiana. Newberry Library describes the work as "one of the most significant historical projects undertaken in the last twenty years".

== History ==
Inspired by encyclopedia compilation efforts of cities such as New York City, Indianapolis and Cleveland, Keating approached the Newberry Library in 1991 to strategize on how to best to study and teach Chicago history. Eventually she and Grossman agreed to prepare a funding request from the National Endowment for the Humanities (NEH). Their initial proposal was declined, but after working with Grossman to refine the specifics of their proposal, the NEH accepted their idea. The book venture was originally announced in 1994 as a project funded by a NEH US$200,000 ($434,441 today) grant. The grant also included a $300,000 challenge grant to be met by Newberry Library for the first three years of work. The original plan was to publish a hardcover book by 2001 and then to follow with what at the time was referred to vaguely as "hypermedia" in reference to possible internet and CD-ROM auxiliary products. After Grossman and Keating obtained the initial grant, Reiff, a historian with computer expertise, and encyclopedia veteran Carol J. Summerfield all became part of the team. The editors sought the advice of Chicago-area librarians who were organized into focus groups to determine the proper components for the planned publication. The editors also organized into task forces of experts in dozens of specialized fields. Early on they sought the expertise of University of Chicago cartographer Michael P. Conzen, who helped develop 56 original maps. Conzen is credited as the cartographic editor.

By 1997, the text had taken shape and the plan was that the average biographical entry would be 150 words. The longest biographical entries, about 450 words, were written for former Chicago Mayors Harold Washington and Richard J. Daley. Neither Richard M. Daley nor Michael Jordan had entries because only notable deceased persons were included. By 1998, the editors had settled on the table of contents and begun the job of assigning, editing, fact-checking and re-editing the hundreds of entries, some of them as long as 4000 words. By March 2000, 1100 of the targeted 1400 entries were completed. Also, the growth of the internet had clarified the vision of an online version of the print edition. In 2000, the final volume was expected to be 1300 pages set for release in fall 2002. The internet version was expected the following year. By June 2001, nearly 1300 of the entries had been submitted and a third had been edited and reviewed for accuracy. The effort had become a $2.5 million effort and was aspiring towards the success of earlier encyclopedic efforts projecting a fall 2003 publication of a 1.3-million-word 1300-page edition. At this time, the final electronic form available through the Chicago Historical Society had been conceptualized.

== Public release ==
By 2001, two editions of The Encyclopedia of Cleveland History (1987) had sold 24,000 copies; The Encyclopedia of Indianapolis (1994) had sold 9000 copies and The Encyclopedia of New York City (1995) had sold 70,000 (50,000 in its first year). Hardcover versions of these works had sold for $59.95 and up. The commercial success of these other regional encyclopedias made it clear that there is a market for such products. Several university presses released regional encyclopedic publications in 2004. In April, Rutgers University Press published The Encyclopedia of New Jersey. In September, the University of Nebraska Press published Encyclopedia of the Great Plains. In October, the University of Chicago Press released The Encyclopedia of Chicago. Additionally, Yale University Press was scheduled to publish both Encyclopedia of New England and the second edition of The Encyclopedia of New York City.

Using press releases from the Copley News Service, the book was widely publicized throughout the state of Illinois, and it was even reviewed by The Wall Street Journal. When first published in 2004, the book was on the USA Today recommended Christmas gifts list. That year it was at the top of the Chicago area bestseller lists at bookstores during the Christmas holiday season. Major funding for the $65 list price four-color print version of the publication, which cost $1.7 million in the end, was provided by the NEH, the MacArthur Foundation, the City of Chicago and the State of Illinois.

=== Electronic edition ===
At the time of the print release, the online version, known as the Electronic Encyclopedia of Chicago, was being developed to include additional features, which relied on hyperlinks, that were not available in the print edition. At the time, it was expected to be released by the Chicago Historical Society in April 2005. On May 11, the Electronic edition, which cost nearly $1 million to create and is continuously available for free to the public, was released. It included hundreds of additional entries (bringing the total to 1766), more than 1000 additional images, video of historic figures and events, and extensive primary source material. The online version includes 1000 more sources than the print edition. The Web site includes many tables and maps that date to the 19th Century. Northwestern University media specialists developed the Web architecture for the electronic version. The electronic edition made Chicago the second major U.S. city (following Cleveland) with an extensive Internet encyclopedia dedicated to its history and its release was covered by newspapers throughout the Midwest. The extra features of the online edition would have required 10,000 pages to produce in print-edition format. Initially, the online edition was a static version, but updates and adjustments were planned.

== Critical review ==
USA Today referred to it as a good coffee table book. Chicago Tribune journalist Rick Kogan describes this as a massive undertaking with the natural foibles of the human element in it selections and accuracy, and by nature of its attempt to serve as a historical compilation an immediately dated product due to the dynamic nature of the city. However, he feels it is sure to amaze its audience. A Chicago Sun-Times reviewer describes it as a scholarly product that is "easily the most comprehensive reference book on the Chicago region ever published". The State Journal-Register, the Springfield, Illinois newspaper, reviewers complain that downstate cities and regions are neglected in the book. A Daily Herald review describes it as a book accurately "billed as the city's most definitive historical reference book". The Peoria Journal Star notes that although there are complaints about omissions and underserved topics, the online version should quell the demands for further knowledge.

The online version was noted for its "large number of tables and maps that date to the 19th Century" by the Chicago Tribune. Dubuque, Iowa's Telegraph Herald newspaper and Indiana's Post-Tribune referenced an Associated Press press release that described the online version as a compilation assembled "with more than Chicagoans in mind". The Chicago Tribune described the online version as an extension of "the most comprehensive reference book on the Chicago region ever published" that is unlimited by physical bounds.

Journal of American History along with the website History Matters: The U.S. Survey Course on the Web published a review by University of Southern California professor Philip J. Ethington that spoke glowingly about both versions of the encyclopedia describing it as "one of the finest collective works (with 633 listed authors) of North American historical scholarship of our era". They praised it for its breadth and coherence. The online version was noted for its meticulous hyperlinking. The online review was cursory in the sense that it did not realize the expansion of the online version. However, the review notes that the online version provides "powerful and substantive" interactive resources that are not possible in the print edition. The review is especially respectful of the cartographic contributions, which it describes in detail. It dismisses the alphabetical structure of the online version as an unnecessary complication. The review also complains about biographical omissions that necessitate extensive navigation to related articles. The review felt some of the online foibles left open the possibility that the production might get overshadowed by future ventures that leverage the electronic possibilities more fully.

The Chronicle of Higher Education reviewed the Encyclopedia along with several of its peers and mentioned early in the review that the advent of online encyclopedias makes the works much easier to correct and update. However, the availability of online encyclopedias diminished the significance of the print editions according to the review because it made gifting them less significant and it reduced sales at libraries. The review also noted that the online approach is becoming so successful that the state of Georgia has produced the online-only New Georgia Encyclopedia, which started as a 300-article venture and has blossomed to a 1300-article work. However, they noted that when the Encyclopedia of Chicago was first released that the local media supported the book; some Chicago disc jockeys read passages from it on air. It enjoyed successful marketing as both a popular gift item and a must-have for local historians.

== Content ==
The encyclopedia is composed of 1117 pages that feature over 1400 entries by more than 600 contributors. Additionally, it includes 442 maps, more than 400 vintage photographs, over 250 sketches of "historically significant business enterprises", a dictionary of Chicago-area businesses, a biographical dictionary and a 21-page timeline that traces the history of Chicago from 1630 to 2000.

The 1400-entry main alphabetical section of the Encyclopedia covers all Chicago neighborhoods, suburbs, and ethnic groups as well as the major cultural institutions. Topics covered include technology and science, architecture, religions, immigration, transportation, business history, labor, music, health and medicine. It is considered the most geographical diverse city encyclopedia of its kind because it fully encompasses the suburbs in eight of the region's counties. 386 thumbnail maps of neighborhoods and municipalities are complemented by 400 black-and-white photographs plus hundreds of color photographs and thematic maps. There are separate lengthy interpretive essays woven into the alphabetical section on topics such as the built environment, literary images of Chicago, and the city's sports culture. The Encyclopedia includes a 2000-entry comprehensive biographical dictionary and a detailed listing of approximately 250 of the city's historically significant business enterprises. A color insert features a timeline of Chicago history and photo essays exploring nine pivotal years in this history. The photo essays feature the city's urban art and artifacts.
