= Bibliography of suburbs =

A large number of books and articles have been written on the subject of suburbs and suburban living as a regional, national or worldwide phenomenon. This is a selected bibliography of scholarly and analytical works, listed by subject region and focus.

== Europe ==
- Archer, John. Architecture and Suburbia: From English Villa to American Dream House, 1690–2000. University of Minnesota Press, 2005.
- Boulton, Jeremy. Neighbourhood and Society: A London Suburb in the Seventeenth Century (Cambridge Studies in Population, Economy and Society in Past Time) (2005)
- Dyos, Harold James. Victorian suburb;: A study of the growth of Camberwell (1966)
- Galinou, Mireille. Cottages and Villas: The Birth of the Garden Suburb (2011)
- Jordan, Christine. Illustrated History of Leicester's Suburbs (2003)
- Kuchta, Todd. Semi-Detached Empire: Suburbia and the Colonization of Britain, 1880 to the Present (2010)
- Robey, Ann et al. Rediscovered Utopias: Saving London's Suburbs (2010)
- Vaughan, Laura et al. Suburban Urbanities. UCL Press (2015) Available free from https://dx.doi.org/10.14324/111.9781910634134
- Wilks, John. Walks Through History - Birmingham: Edgbaston: the creation of luxury suburbia (2011)
- Williams, Guy R. London in the Country: The Growth of Suburbia (1975)

== Canada ==
- Harris, Richard. Unplanned Suburbs: Toronto's American Tragedy, 1900 to 1950 (1999)
- Harris, Richard. Creeping Conformity: How Canada Became Suburban, 1900-1960 (2004)
- Lewis, Robert. Manufacturing Montreal: The Making of an Industrial Landscape, 1850 to 1930. Johns Hopkins University Press, 2001.
- Lorimer, James, and Evelyn Ross. The Second City Book: Studies of Urban and Suburban Canada (1977)
- Morton, Suzanne. Ideal Surroundings: Domestic Life in a Working-Class Suburb in the 1920s (Studies in Gender and History) (1995)
- Whitzman, Carolyn. Suburb, Slum, Urban Village: Transformations in Toronto's Parkdale Neighbourhood, 1875-2002 (2010)

== United States ==
=== Surveys ===
- Baxandall, Rosalyn and Elizabeth Ewen. Picture Windows: How the Suburbs Happened. New York: Basic Books, 2000.
- Beauregard, Robert A. When America Became Suburban. University of Minnesota Press, 2006.
- Bruegmann, Robert. Sprawl: A Compact History. University of Chicago Press, 2005.
- Duany, Andrés and Elizabeth Plater-Zyberk. Suburban Nation: The Rise of Sprawl and the Decline of the American Dream. North Point Press, 2000.
- Fishman, Robert. Bourgeois Utopias: The Rise and Fall of Suburbia. Basic Books, 1987.
- Gardner, Todd. “The Slow Wave: The Changing Residential Status of Cities and Suburbs in the United States, 1850–1949.” Journal of Urban History 27, no. 3 (March 2001): 293–312.
- Hanlon, Bernadette, John Rennie Short and Thomas J. Vicino. Cities and Suburbs: New Metropolitan Realities in the U.S. Routledge, 2010.
- Harris, Richard and Robert Lewis. “The Geography of North American Cities and Suburbs, 1900–1950: A New Synthesis.” Journal of Urban History 27, no. 3 (March 2001): 262–92.
- Hayden, Dolores. Building Suburbia: Green Fields and Urban Growth, 1820–2000. Vintage Books, 2003.
- Jackson, Kenneth T. (1985). Crabgrass frontier: The suburbanization of the United States. New York: Oxford University Press. ISBN 0-19-504983-7. OCLC 11785435.
- Kenyon, Amy. Dreaming Suburbia: Detroit and the Production of Postwar Space and Culture. Wayne State University Press, 2004.
- Muller, Peter O. Contemporary Suburban America. Prentice–Hall, 1981.
- Mumford, Lewis. The Culture of Cities. Harcourt Brace, 1938.
- Mumford, Lewis. “Suburbia — and Beyond.” In The City in History: Its Origins, Its Transformations, and Its Prospects, by Lewis Mumford, 483–503. Harcourt, Brace & World, 1961.
- Nicolaides, Becky M. and Andrew Weise, editors. The Suburb Reader. Routledge, 2006.
- Palen, J. John. The Suburbs. McGraw–Hill, 1995.
- Stilgoe, John R. Borderland: Origins of the American Suburb, 1820–1939. Yale University Press, 1989.
- Teaford, Jon C. The American Suburb: The Basics. Routledge, 2008.
- Teaford, Jon C. The Metropolitan Revolution: The Rise of Post-Urban America (2006)

=== Specialized studies ===
- Archer, John. Architecture and Suburbia: From English Villa to American Dream House, 1690–2000. Minneapolis: University of Minnesota Press, 2005.
- Archer, John. “Country and City in the American Romantic Suburb.” The Journal of the Society of Architectural Historians 42, no. 2 (May 1983): 139–56.
- Baldassare, Mark. Trouble in Paradise: The Suburban Transformation in America. New York: Columbia University Press, 1986.
- Baumgartner, M. P. The Moral Order of a Suburb. New York: Oxford University Press, 1988.
- Binford, Henry C. The First Suburbs: Residential Communities on the Boston Periphery, 1815–1860. Chicago: University of Chicago Press, 1985.
- Blakely, Edward J. and Mary Gail Snyder. Fortress America: Gated Communities in the United States. Washington, D.C.: Brookings Institution, 1997.
- Blauvelt, Andrew, ed. Worlds Away: New Suburban Landscapes. Walker Art Center, 2008.
- Conn, Steven and Max Page, editors. Building the Nation: Americans Write About Their Architecture, Their Cities, and Their Landscape. University of Pennsylvania Press, 2003.
- Crawford, Margaret. Building the Workingman’s Paradise: The Design of American Company Towns. Verso, 1995.
- Davis, Mike. City of Quartz: Excavating the Future in Los Angeles. London: Verso, 1990.
- Donoghue, John. Alexander Jackson Davis, Romantic Architect, 1803–1892. New York: Arno Press, 1977.
- Douglass, Harlan Paul. The Suburban Trend. 1925.
- Downs, Jr., Arthur Channing. “Downing’s Newburgh Villa.” Bulletin of the Association for Preservation Technology 4, nos. 3–4 (1972): 1–113.
- Ebner, Michael H. Creating Chicago’s North Shore: A Suburban History. Chicago: University of Chicago Press, 1988.
- Flint, Anthony. This Land: The Battle Over Sprawl and the Future of America. Johns Hopkins University Press, 2006.
- Fogelson, Robert M. Bourgeois Nightmares: Suburbia, 1870–193'. Yale University Press, 2005.
- Garreau, Joel. Edge City: Life on the New Frontier. New York: Doubleday, 1991.
- Gruenberg, Sidonie Matsner. "The Challenge of the New Suburbs." Marriage and Family Living 17, no. 2 (May 1955): 133–37.
- Hanlon, Bernadette.Once the American Dream: Inner ring Suburbs of the Metropolitan United States. Philadelphia: Temple University Press, 2010.
- Harris, Richard and Robert Lewis. “Constructing a Fault(y) Zone: Misrepresentations of American Cities and Suburbs, 1900–1950.” Annals of the Association of American Geographers 88, no. 4 (1998): 622–41.
- Hayden, Dolores. Building Suburbia: Green Fields and Urban Growth, 1920–2000. New York: Pantheon Books, 2003.
- Henderson, Susan. “Llewellyn Park, Suburban Idyll.” Journal of Garden History 7, no. 3 (July–September 1987): 221–43.
- Hise, Greg. Magnetic Los Angeles: Planning the Twentieth-Century Metropolis. Johns Hopkins University Press, 1997.
- Hope, Andrew. "Evaluation the Significance of San Lorenzo Village, A Mid-20th Century Suburban Community." CRM: The Journal of Heritage Stewardship 2 (Summer 2005): 50–61.
- Hope, Andrew. "Evaluation the Significance of San Lorenzo Village, A Mid-20th Century Suburban Community." CRM: The Journal of Heritage Stewardship 2 (Summer 2005): 50–61.
- Jackson, John Brinckerhoff. Discovering the Vernacular Landscape. Yale University Press, 1984.
- Jacobs, Jane. Dark Age Ahead. Random House, 2004.
- Kargon, Robert Hugh and Arthur P. Molella. Invented Edens: Techno-Cities of the Twentieth Century. MIT Press, 2008.
- Katz, Bruce and Robert E. Lang, editors. Redefining Urban and Suburban America: Evidence from Census 2000. Brookings, 2003.
- Katz, Peter, editor. The New Urbanism: Toward an Architecture of Community. Afterword by Vincent Scully. McGraw–Hill, 1994.
- Kay, Jane Holtz. Asphalt Nation: How the Automobile took over America, and How We Can Take it Back. Crown Publishers, 1997.
- Keating, Ann Durkin. Building Chicago: Suburban Developers and the Creation of a Divided Metropolis. Ohio State University Press, 1988.
- Kelly, Barbara. Expanding the American Dream: Building and Rebuilding Levittown. State University of Albany Press, 1993.
- Kolson Hurley, Amanda (2019). Radical Suburbs: Experimental Living on the Fringes of the American City. Belt Publishing. ISBN 978-1948742368. - case studies of six unusual suburbs
- Low, Setha. Behind the Gates: Life, Security, and the Pursuit of Happiness in Fortress America. New York: Routledge, 2003.
- Lukez, Paul. Suburban Transformations. New York: Princeton Architectural Press, 2007.
- Mattingly, Paul H. Suburban Landscapes: Culture and Politics in a New York Metropolitan Community. Johns Hopkins University Press, 2001.
- McKenzie, Evan. Privatopia: Homeowner Associations and the Rise of Residential Private Government. New Haven, Conn.: Yale University Press, 1994.
- Morton, Marian. "The Suburban Ideal and Suburban Realities: Cleveland Heights, Ohio, 1860–2001." Journal of Urban History 28, no. 5 (September 2002) 671–98.
- Nicolaides, Becky M. My Blue Heaven: Life and Politics in the Working-Class Suburbs of Los Angeles, 1920–1965. University of Chicago Press, 2002.
- O'Connell, James C. The Hub's Metropolis: Greater Boston's Development From Railroad Suburbs to Smart Growth (MIT Press; 2013) 326 pages
- O'Toole, Randall. "The Vanishing Automobile and Other Urban Myths" The Thoreau Institute.
- Orfield, Myron. American Metropolitics: The New Suburban Reality. Brookings Institution Press, 2002.
- Russell, James S. “When Suburbs Become Mega-Suburbs.” Architectural Record 191, no. 8 (August 2003): 76–81.
- Rybczynski, Witold (November 7, 2005). "Suburban Despair". Slate.
- Rybczynski, Witold. "How to Build a Suburb." The Wilson Quarterly 19 no. 3 (Summer 2005): 114–126.
- Salamon, Sonya. Newcomers to Old Towns: Suburbanization of the Heartland. University of Chicago Press, 2003.
- Sandul, Paul J. P. California Dreaming: Boosterism, Memory, and Rural Suburbs in the Golden State. West Virginia University Press, 2014.
- Schuyler, David. Apostle of Taste: Andrew Jackson Downing, 1815–1852. Johns Hopkins University Press, 1996.
- Schuyler, David. The New Urban Landscape: The Redefinition of Form in Nineteenth-Century America. Johns Hopkins University Press, 1986.
- Sies, Mary Corbin. “The City Transformed: Nature, Technology, and the Suburban Ideal, 1877–1917.” Journal of Urban History 14, no. 1 (November 1987): 81–111.
- Sies, Mary Corbin. American Urban History: The Everyday Politics and Spatial Logics of Metropolitan Life. Urban History Review/Revue d’histoire 32, no. 1 (Fall 2003): 28–42.
- Sies, Mary Corbin. “Paradise Retained: An Analysis of Persistence in Planned, Exclusive Suburbs, 1880–1980.” Planning Perspectives 12 (1997): 165–91.
- Smith, Albert C. & Schank, Kendra (1999). "A Grotesque Measure for Marietta". Journal of Urban Design 4 (3).
- Stevens, William K. “Beyond the Mall: Suburbs Evolving into ‘Outer City.’” New York Times, November 8, 1987, E5.
- Sweeting, Adam W. Reading Houses and Building Books: Andrew Jackson Downing and the Architecture of Popular Antebellum Literature, 1835–1855. University Press of New England, 1996.
- Tatum, George B. and Elisabeth Blair MacDougall, editors. Prophet with Honor: The Career of Andrew Jackson Downing, 1815–1852. Dumbarton Oaks Colloquium on the History of Landscape Architecture. Washington, D.C.: Dumbarton Oaks Research Library and Collection, 1989.
- Walker, Richard and Robert Lewis. “Beyond the Crabgrass Frontier: Industry and the Spread of North American Cities, 1850–1950.” Journal of Historical Geography 27, no. 1 (January 2001): 3–19.
- Warner, Jr., Sam Bass. Streetcar Suburbs: The Process of Growth in Boston, 1870–1900. 1962.
- Wilson, Richard Guy. “Idealism and the Origin of the First American Suburb: Llewellyn Park, New Jersey.” American Art Journal (October 1979): 79–90.
- Jackson, Kenneth T.. "All the World's a Mall: Reflections on the Social and Economic Consequences of the American Shopping Center." The American Historical Review 101 no. 4 (October 1996): 1111–1121.
- Wright, Gwendolyn. Building the Dream: A Social History of Housing in America. Pantheon Books, 1981.
- von Hoffman, Alexander. Local Attachments: The Making of an American Urban Neighborhood, 1850–1920. Johns Hopkins University Press, 1994.

=== Women, family, lifestyles and images ===
- Clark, Jr., Clifford Edward. The American Family Home, 1800–1960. University of North Carolina Press, 1986.
- Coon, David R. Look Closer: Suburban Narratives and American Values in Film and Television )Rutgers University Press; 2013) 269 pages; explores the critical image of suburbia in such films and TV shows as American Beauty, The Truman Show, Mr. & Mrs. Smith, Desperate Housewives, Weeds, and Big Love.
- Friedan, Betty. The Feminine Mystique. Norton, 1963.
- Marsh, Margaret. Suburban Lives. Rutgers University Press, 1990.
- Marsh, Margaret. "Suburban Men and Masculine Domesticity.” American Quarterly 40, no. 2 (June 1988): 165–86.
- Murray, Sylvie. The Progressive Housewife: Community Activism in Suburban Queens. University of Pennsylvania Press, 2004.
- Putman, Robert D. Bowling Alone: The Collapse and Revival of American Community. Simon & Schuster, 2000.
- Whyte, Jr., William H. The Organization Man. Simon and Schuster, 1956.
- Wright, Gwendolyn. Moralism and the Model Home: Domestic Architecture and Cultural Conflict in Chicago, 1870–1913. University of Chicago Press, 1980

=== Race ===
- Avila, Eric. Popular Culture in the Age of White Flight: Fear and Fantasy in Suburban Los Angeles. Berkeley: University of California Press, 2004.
- Greason, Walter D. "Suburban Erasure: How the Suburbs Ended the Civil Rights Movement in New Jersey". Madison: Fairleigh Dickinson University Press, 2013.
- Fong, Timothy P. The First Suburban Chinatown: The Remaking of Monterey Park, California. Philadelphia: Temple University Press, 1994.
- Haynes, Bruce D. Red Lines, Black Spaces: The Politics of Race and Space in a Black Middle-Class Suburb. New Haven: Yale University Press, 2001.
- Johnson, Ronald M. “From Romantic Suburb to Racial Enclave: LeDroit Park, Washington, D.C., 1880–1920.” Phylon 45, no. 4 (4th Quarter 1984): 264–70.
- Kalita, S. Mitra. Suburban Sahibs: Three Immigrant Families and Their Passage from India to America. Rutgers University Press, 2003.
- Kirp, David L., John P. Dwyer, and Larry A. Rosenthal Our Town: Race, Housing, and the Soul of Suburbia. Rutgers University Press, 1995.
- Kruse, Kevin M. White Flight: Atlanta and the Making of Modern Conservatism. Princeton University Press, 2005.
- Li, Wei. “Building Ethnoburbia: The Emergence and Manifestation of the Chinese Ethnoburb in Los Angeles’ San Gabriel Valley.” Journal of Asian American Studies 2, no. 1 (February 1999): 1–29.
- Lipsitz, George. The Possessive Investment in Whiteness: How White People Profit from Identity Politics. Temple University Press, 1998.
- Moore, Shirley Ann Wilson. To Place Our Deeds: The African American Community in Richmond, California, 1910–1963. University of California Press, 2000.
- Orser, W. Edward. “Secondhand Suburbs: Black Pioneers in Baltimore’s Edmondson Village, 1955–1980.” Journal of Urban History 10, no. 3 (May 1990): 227–62.
- O’ Mara, Margaret Pugh. “Suburbia Reconsidered: Race, Politics, and Prosperity in the Twentieth Century.” Journal of Social History 39, no. 1 (Fall 2005): 229–44.
- Pattillo-McCoy, Mary. Black Pickett Fences: Privilege and Peril among the Black Middle Class. University of Chicago Press, 1999.
- Self, Robert O. American Babylon: Race and the Struggle for Postwar Oakland. Princeton University Press, 2003.
- Sugrue, Thomas J. The Origins of the Urban Crisis: Race and Inequality in Postwar Detroit. Princeton University Press, 1996.
- Taylor, Jr., Henry L. “The Building of a Black Industrial Suburb: The Lincoln Heights, Ohio.” Thesis, State University of New York at Buffalo, 1979.
- Vicino, Thomas J. Transforming Race and Class in Suburbia: Decline in Metropolitan Baltimore. New York: Palgrave Macmillan, 2008.
- Weise, Andrew. Places of Their Own: African American Suburbanization in the Twentieth Century. Chicago: The University of Chicago Press, 2004.
- Weise, Andrew. “Black Housing, White Finance: African American Housing and Home Ownership in Evanston, Illinois, before 1940.” Journal of Social History 33, no. 2 (Winter 1999): 429–60.
- Weise, Andrew. “Places of Our Own: Suburban Black Towns before 1960.” Journal of Urban History 19, no. 3 (1993): 30–54.
- Wilson, William H. Hamilton Park: A Planned Black Community in Dallas. Baltimore: Johns Hopkins University Press, 1998.

=== Environment and geography ===
- Blake, Peter. God’s Own Junkyard: The Planned Deterioration of America’s Landscape. New York: Holt, Rinehart and Winston, 1964.
- Jindrich, Jason, “Suburbs in the City: Reassessing the Location of Nineteenth-Century American Working-Class Suburbs,” Social Science History, 36 (Summer 2012), 147–67.
- Kunstler, James Howard. The Geography of Nowhere: The Rise and Decline of America's Man-Made Landscape. Simon and Schuster, 1993.
- Rome, Adam Ward. The Bulldozer in the Countryside: Suburban Sprawl and the Rise of American Environmentalism. New York: Cambridge University Press, 2001.
- Winkler, Robert. Going Wild: Adventures with Birds in the Suburban Wilderness. Washington, D.C.: National Geographic, 2003.

=== Politics ===
- Dreir, Peter, John Mollenkopf, and Todd Swanstrom. Place Matters: Metropolitics for the Twenty-first Century. University of Kansas Press, 2002.
- Gans, Herbert J. The Levittowners: Ways of Life and Politics in a New Suburban Community. New York: Pantheon, 1967.
- Lassiter, Matthew D. "The New Suburban History II: Political Culture and Metropolitan Space.” Journal of Planning History 4, no. 1 (February 2005): 75–88.
- Lassiter, Matthew D. The Silent Majority: Suburban Politics in the Sunbelt South. Princeton, N.J: Princeton University Press, 2006.
- Lassiter, Matthew D. “Suburban Strategies: The Volatile Center in Postwar Politics.” In The Democratic Experiment: New Directions in American Political History, edited by Meg Jacobs, William J. Novak, and Julian E. Zelizer, 327–49. Princeton: Princeton University Press, 2003.
- McGirr, Lisa. Suburban Warriors: The Origins of the New American Right. Princeton University Press, 2001.
- Oliver, J. Eric. Democracy in Suburbia. Princeton University Press, 2001.
- Teaford, Jon C. City and Suburb: The Political Fragmentation of Metropolitan America, 1850–1970. Baltimore: Johns Hopkins University Press, 1979.
- Vicino, Thomas J. Suburban Crossroads: The Fight for Local Control of Immigration Policy. Lanham, MD: Lexington Books, 2013.

=== Historiography ===
- Archer, John; Paul J.P. Sandul, and Katherine Solomonson (eds.), Making Suburbia: New Histories of Everyday America. Minneapolis, MN: University of Minnesota Press, 2015.
- Ebner, Michael H. "Re-Reading Suburban America: Urban Population Deconcentration, 1810-1980," American Quarterly (1985) 37#3 pp. 368-381 in JSTOR
- Kruse, Kevin M, and Thomas J. Sugrue, editors. The New Suburban History. Chicago: University of Chicago Press, 2006.
- McManus, Ruth, and Philip J. Ethington, "Suburbs in transition: new approaches to suburban history," Urban History, Aug 2007, Vol. 34 Issue 2, pp 317–337
- McShane, Clay. "The State of the Art in North American Urban History," Journal of Urban History (2006) 32#4 pp 582–597, identifies a loss of influence by such writers as Lewis Mumford, Robert Caro, and Sam Warner, a continuation of the emphasis on narrow, modern time periods, and a general decline in the importance of the field. Comments by Timothy Gilfoyle and Carl Abbott contest the latter conclusion.
- Nickerson, Michelle. "Beyond Smog, Sprawl, and Asphalt: Developments in the Not-So-New Suburban History," Journal of Urban History (2015) 41#1 pp 171–180. covers 1934 to 2011. DOI: 10.1177/0096144214551724.
- Seligman, Amanda I. “The New Suburban History”. Journal of Planning History 3, no. 4 (November 2004): 312–33.
- Shumsky, Larry. Encyclopedia of Urban America: The Cities and Suburbs (2 vol 1998)
- Sies, Mary Corbin. "Beyond Scholarly Orthodoxies in North American Suburban History", Journal of Urban History 27, no. 3 (March 2001): 355–61.
- Vicino, Thomas J. "The political history of a postwar suburban society revisited." History Compass (2008) 6#1 pp: 364–388. online
