= List of Keys to the City in the United States =

The Great Seal of the United States.

This is a list of Keys to the City awarded in the United States.

== Alabama ==
=== Alabaster ===
- October 12, 2015: Bobby Joe Seales, local historian
- October 15, 2018: Mayo Taylor, first African-American city council member

=== Bay Minette ===
- 1984: Lyn Glenn, daughter of astronaut and politician John Glenn
- December 21, 2018: Kirk Jay, singer that competed on The Voice

=== Birmingham ===
- October 3, 1980: Mercer Ellington, musician and son of Duke Ellington

=== Boaz ===
- June 14, 2019: Richard Glazier, sawmill owner

=== Brewton ===
- November 2021: William Lee Golden and The Goldens, country musicians

=== Calera ===
- May 2025: Dennis Torrealba President Of Calera Main St

=== Cullman ===
- November 10, 2017: Roy Drinkard, developer and Marine

=== Gadsden ===
- 1984: John Glenn, astronaut and politician

=== Hoover ===
- July 13, 2016: Paul Reinhardt, USS Alabama commander
- February 18, 2019: Ajah Robinson, Anthonia Anwah, and Aiyana Hines, three high schoolers who aided an injured woman during the fallout of the Killing of Emantic Fitzgerald Bradford Jr.
- January 21, 2020: Foster Dudley, fourth-grade student

=== Huntsville ===
- July 12, 2013: Jase Robertson, star of reality TV series Duck Dynasty
- June 28, 2015: Microwave Dave, North Alabama musician and music educator
- September 28, 2016: Dennis L. Via, US Army General

=== Mobile ===
- February 5, 2013: Captain Munnerlyn, NFL player for the Carolina Panthers
- Spring 2013: A. J. McCarron and C.J. Mosley, XFL and NFL football players
- July 12, 2016: Jaquiski Tartt, NFL player for the San Francisco 49ers
- September 20, 2017: Nicolas Cage, actor
- November 14, 2022: Daniel K. Wims, president of Alabama A&M University, and Thomas Hudson, president of Jackson State University
- February 18, 2023: Latisha D. Scott, actor. Love and Marriage Huntsville.

=== Mountain Brook ===
- September 23, 2019: Kevin Alexander, local dentist
- January 18, 2022: Rodney Davis, local chef and tavern employee

=== Orange Beach ===
- October 5, 2023: Jason Aldean, country musician

=== Phenix City ===
- 1984: Lyn Glenn, daughter of astronaut and politician John Glenn

=== Scottsboro ===
- 1984: John Glenn, astronaut and politician
- October 24, 2022: Gary Stewart, town council member

=== Selma ===
- May 5, 2023: Daryl D. Thomas, accountant

=== Tallassee ===
- January 22, 2018: Derrick Ansley, defensive back football coach

=== Troy ===
- April 19, 2016: DeMarcus Ware, NFL player for the Denver Broncos

== Alaska ==
=== Homer ===
- 2012: Vicki Sarber, pageant contestant and Mrs. America 2012

=== Kodiak ===
- July 30, 2012: Pitbull, rapper

=== Palmer ===
- May 7, 2021: Captain Matt Seakup, Captain Chris Brunner, and Sergeant Andy Reynolds, members of the 176th Wing in the Alaska Air National Guard

=== Wasilla ===
- September 22, 2011: Landon Swank, illusionist

== California ==
=== Anaheim ===
- February 1940: Connie Mack, baseball catcher, manager, and team owner

=== Antioch ===
- December 12, 2022: Bianca Palomera, restaurant worker who lost an eye in an attack after defending a disabled customer

=== Artesia ===
- March 29, 2009: Nithyananda, Hindu guru

=== Bakersfield ===
- October 29, 1988: Pelé, soccer player
- July 30, 2012: John and Joe Lanni, restaurateurs

=== Beverly Hills ===
- September 2, 2010: Entertainment mogul family the Kardashian–Jenner family and radio host Larry King were awarded the key to the city of Beverly Hills, the award date falling (by design) on a day designated by the city's famous zip code, 90210.
- March 1, 2011: Television personality and restaurateur Lisa Vanderpump was presented a key to the city by then-mayor Jimmy Delshad for her charitable and philanthropic work; subsequently, Delshad designated March 1 as "Lisa Vanderpump Day", both dates being Vanderpump's birthday.
- October 18, 2022: Charles Aronberg, former mayor and physician

=== Blythe ===
- April 3, 2019: Andrew Cancio, boxer

=== Burbank ===
- August 22, 2017: Adam Schiff, state representative
- May 2021: Mickey DePalo, local community worker

=== Clearlake ===
- December 21, 2022: Andrew White, retired local police chief

=== Coachella ===
- April 11, 2019: Los Tucanes de Tijuana, Mexican norteño band
- April 22, 2023: Becky G, singer and actress

=== Coalinga ===
- December 6, 2018: Nathan Vosburg, outgoing mayor of Coalinga

=== Compton ===
- 2014: Dr. Dre, rapper and record producer
- February 13, 2016: Kendrick Lamar, rapper and songwriter

=== Corona ===
- March 12, 2010: Scarlett's Magic, a Savannah cat owned by the Draper family and recognized Guinness Book of World Records as the World's Tallest Cat

=== Coronado ===
- July 1, 2020: Donna Salof, community worker and philanthropist

=== Cypress ===
- 1994: Tiger Woods, golfer
- January 20, 2016: Dan Ta, youth money management educator

=== Daly City ===
- July 22, 2022: Jo Koy, comedian

=== Danville ===
- January 16, 2009: Chesley B. Sullenberger III, fighter pilot, diplomat, and saver of US Airways Flight 1549

=== Desert Hot Springs ===
- June 20, 2023: DannyLux, Latin musician

=== Diamond Bar ===
- January 24, 2016: Alex Morgan, soccer player

=== Elk Grove ===
- June 18, 2014: Kyle Larson, race car driver
- December 10, 2014: Jim Cooper, city council member
- November 6, 2015: Lance Briggs, football player for the Chicago Bears
- May 28, 2016: Josephine Finley Prince, local centenarian
- August 27, 2016: Elizabeth Pinkerton, educator, author, and local historian
- May 14, 2017: Ann Pinto, local centenarian
- May 24, 2017: Leo Fassler, community member
- August 26, 2017: Donald Ralph, Air Force commander
- August 26, 2017: Karissa Trinchera, Special Olympics swimmer
- August 26, 2017: Mathilde Mukantabana, Rwandan ambassador to the US
- August 26, 2017: Roy Herburger, news reporter
- December 26, 2017: Bertha Weber Kraus, local centenarian
- March 8, 2018: Joseph Sieber, local centenarian
- May 16, 2018: Samuel Rinelli, local centenarian
- May 17, 2018: Jamie Whitmore, paracyclist
- June 2, 2018: Emma Virginia Fife, local centenarian
- July 15, 2018: Chalmers Gage, local centenarian
- December 28, 2018: Lydia Christina Wacker, local centenarian
- February 27, 2019: Joey Hand, racing driver
- July 29, 2019: Maureen Gertrude Gabriel, local centenarian
- October 3, 2022: Candido Montalbano, local centenarian

=== Indio ===
- 2011: Bob Ladiin, honorary mayor
- 2013: Alexander Haagan III, owner of the Empire Polo Club
- 2008 & 2015: Order of the Eastern Star, Masonic appendant body

=== Inglewood ===
- February 12, 2022: Issa Rae, actress and writer
- February 16, 2022: Stan Kroenke, businessman and owner of Kroenke Sports & Entertainment
- June 18, 2023: D Smoke, rapper
- October 17, 2023: Becky G, singer

=== Lancaster ===
- April 30, 2015: Matt Anderson, Gateway Teacher of the Year 2015

=== La Puente ===
- November 16, 1962: John F. Kennedy, US President

=== Long Beach ===
- February 27, 1983: HM Queen Elizabeth II, Queen of the United Kingdom.
- March 2018: Carmen Perez, community worker
- December 13, 2022: NAACP Long Beach branch president Naomi Rainey-Pierson and local newspaper editor and columnist Rich Archbold

=== Los Angeles ===
- October 1984: Sally Ride, astronaut
- 2006: Twenty-seven Victoria's Secret Angels – including Gisele Bündchen, Adriana Lima, Alessandra Ambrosio, Karolina Kurkova, Selita Ebanks, and Izabel Goulart – were presented with a key to Hollywood by honorary mayor Johnny Grant in honor of the Victoria's Secret Fashion Show being held in Los Angeles for the first time.
- August 7, 2009: Zooey Deschanel, Geoffrey Arend, Mark Waters and Jessica Tuchinsky, stars and producers of the 2009 film (500) Days of Summer, were awarded the key to Los Angeles for the film's inventive use of L.A. locations.
- 2012: Rapper Lil' Kim received the key to the city before a performance in front of 50,000 at a LA Pride festival, for "being a champion for her LGBT fans".
- May 11, 2013: 5th Caliph of the Ahmadiyya Muslim Community, Mirza Masroor Ahmad
- September 23, 2016: Los Angeles Dodgers announcer Vin Scully was awarded the key to the city during a pregame ceremony at Dodger Stadium.
- May 23, 2021: Musician Lady Gaga was awarded the key and May 23 was declared as "Born This Way Day", part of a celebration of the tenth anniversary of Born This Way and its cultural impact. A street painting with the Daniel Quasar's version of the gay flag (which includes trans and queer people of color) featuring the album's title was also unveiled on Robertson Boulevard as a tribute to the album, and how it has inspired the LGBT community over the years.
- October 1, 2022: Los Angeles Dodgers Announcer Jaime Jarrín was awarded the Key to the City of Los Angeles in a pregame ceremony at Dodger Stadium on the day they extended their franchise record to 110 wins in a season.

=== Oakland ===
- 1979: Musical group The Jackson 5
- October 27, 2022: Widow of Huey P. Newton and former member of the Black Panther Party Fredrika Newton, Michelin-starred chef James Syhabout, author Tommy Orange, musician D'wayne Wiggins, and singer Goapele
- November 2022: Mistah F.A.B., rapper
- March 12, 2026: Alysa Liu, Olympic gold medalist figure skater

=== Richmond ===
- c. 1984–1996: James Brown, musician

=== Ridgecrest ===
- July 22, 2022: Doug Lueck, community worker

=== Sacramento ===
- September 11, 2015: Spencer Stone, Alek Skarlatos and Anthony Sadler, for actions taken to stop the 2015 Thalys train attack.
- 2017: Chance the Rapper, rapper
- June 2023: Arik Armstead, NFL player

=== San Bernardino ===
- January 20, 2024: Jayden Daniels, football player
- September 17, 2026: Fuerza Regida, regional Mexican music band

=== San Diego ===
- August 28, 1965: Rock band The Beatles were presented with the key to the city by four teenage girls. The presentation was the idea of Susan Clark, a local fan who petitioned Mayor Frank Curran with the idea.
- July 2, 2021: Andra Day, singer/songwriter and actress
- May 23, 2023: Lincoln Hornets, high school football team

=== San Francisco ===
- 1916: Russian-born American businessman, candy-maker and inventor Sam Born was awarded the key to city for inventing a machine that mechanically inserted sticks into lollipops. Later, he went on to found the Just Born candy company in New York.
- August 9, 1941: Hollywood actor Edward Arnold
- 1960: Four Soviet sailors Junior Sergeant Askhat Ziganshin, Private Philip Poplavsky, Private Anatoly Kryuchkovsky, Private Ivan Fedotov
- 1962: Sailor Kenichi Horie
- 1963: Hong Kong music composter/violinist Yin Zizhong
- October 30, 1965: Italian writer and scholar Uguccione Ranieri di Sorbello was presented the key by mayor John F. Shelley.
- December 12, 1966: Israeli Ambassador to the US Avraham Harman was presented the key by mayor John F. Shelley.
- Late 1970s: Sylvester, singer/songwriter
- February 5, 1986: Gbenga Sonuga (now Oba Gbenga Sonuga, Fadesewa The First of Simawa), Director for Arts and Culture in Lagos, was presented the key by Mayor Dianne Feinstein on a culture exchange trip to San Francisco in 1986.
- 1992: Gladys Hansen, city archivist
- November 3, 2010: The San Francisco Giants were awarded the key to the city for winning the 2010 World Series.
- 2011: Tony Bennett, singer
- June 26, 2012: San Francisco Giants pitcher Matt Cain was given the key to the city in commemoration of the perfect game he pitched on June 13, 2012.
- September 29, 2012: Myanmar opposition leader Aung San Suu Kyi was given the key to the city at the San Francisco Bay Area, which is home to the third-largest Burmese community in the USA.
- October 31, 2012: The San Francisco Giants were awarded the key to city of San Francisco for winning the 2012 World Series.
- May 21, 2013: Stephen Curry, professional basketball player for the Golden State Warriors of the National Basketball Association (NBA)
- November 15, 2013: Child cancer patient Batkid is given the key to the city by mayor Ed Lee as part of an event put on by the Make-A-Wish Foundation.
- February 12, 2014: Gavin Newsom, state governor
- October 31, 2014: The San Francisco Giants were awarded the key to city of San Francisco by Mayor Ed Lee for winning the 2014 World Series.
- October 14, 2015: The Golden State Warriors were awarded the key to city of San Francisco by Mayor Ed Lee for winning the 2015 NBA Championship.
- November 2, 2017: Leo Varadkar, Taoiseach (head of government) of Ireland
- January 3, 2025: Steve Kerr, (professional basketball coach and former player of Golden State Warriors of the National Basketball Association (NBA)
- September 27, 2026: Mike Krukow (professional broadcaster and former pitcher for the San Francisco Giants of Major League Baseball)

=== Santa Cruz ===
- February 12, 2014: Gavin Newsom, state governor

=== Seaside ===
- February 16, 2022: Helen Rucker, community activist

=== Stockton ===
- May 22, 2010: Dallas Braden, Oakland Athletics Pitcher who threw a perfect game on May 9, 2010.
- November 16, 2015: God was given the key to the city by Stockton mayor Anthony Silva.
- December 3, 2022: Nate Diaz, mixed martial artist
- May 18, 2023: Stan and Denise Smart, parents of murdered college student Kristin Smart

=== Vallejo ===
- October 21, 2023: E-40, rapper

=== Watts ===
- May 24, 2019: Rapper, Grammy Award winner, and Watts native Jay Rock received the key to the city from council member Joe Buscaino.

=== West Covina ===
- November 17, 2015: The cast and crew of television series Crazy Ex-Girlfriend were awarded with the key to the city of West Covina, the onsite shooting location heavily satirized in the show. A replica of the key was used as a central prop in a season 1 episode and was featured in the protagonist's office afterwards. It currently is on display in the office of series co-creator Aline Brosh McKenna.

=== West Hollywood ===
- May 23, 2018: Stormy Daniels, pornographic film actress
- May 31, 2023: Sisters of Perpetual Indulgence, gay activist group

== Connecticut ==
=== Ansonia ===
- December 16, 2013: Arkeel Newsome and Tom Brockett, local high school football player and coach from Ansonia High School
- May 28, 2017: Tierney Lawlor, basketball player for Ansonia High School and the University of Connecticut
- October 19, 2022: Arthur Solis, local soccer coach for Emmett O'Brien Technical High School

=== Bridgeport ===
- November 2011: Michael Jai White, actor
- February 2016: Marc Anthony, singer/songwriter and actor
- 2018 & 2023: Kevin Hart, comedian and actor
- October 2018: Sheena Graham, state Teacher of the Year 2019
- February 2019: Andre Gray, inventor
- November 2020: 50 Cent, rapper and actor
- 2021: REO Speedwagon, rock band
- 2021: Styx, rock band
- March 2021: Tenisi Davis, actor and activist
- September 2, 2021: The Skinny Boys, hip-hop group
- Unknown date: University of Bridgeport women's soccer team
- 2022: Stevie Nicks, singer/songwriter and producer
- 2022: Dave Matthews, singer/songwriter and musician
- November 17, 2022: Sofia Depassier, Miss Universo Chile 2022
- Unknown date: Loretta Long, actress
- Unknown date: United States Marine Band, band of the US Marine Corps

=== Danbury ===
- June 2014: Nancy Sudik, director of the Danbury Music Center
- November 16, 2021: Glover Teixeira, mixed martial artist

=== Hartford ===
- May 2, 2011: Michael Wilson, theatrical artistic director
- August 10, 2013: Christopher Martin, Jamaican singer/songwriter
- February 15, 2014: John Leguizamo, comedian and actor
- June 10, 2014: Darko Tresnjak, artistic director, recipient of a 2014 Tony Award

=== Middletown ===
- May 29, 2009: Joseph W. Waz, Jr., business executive and native son

=== Milford ===
- August 23, 2019: Enes Kanter Freedom, NBA basketball player for the Boston Celtics

=== New Britain ===
- August 3, 2013: Ryszard Schnepf, Polish ambassador to the U.S.

=== New Haven ===
- December 30, 2019: Local police chief Anthony Duff, WNBA basketball player Bria Holmes, local teacher Malcolm Welfare, community worker Clarence Boyd, journalist and media mogul Veronica Douglas-Givan, entertainment chef Gordon Ramsay as well as, political activist George Mention, columnist James Walker, realtor Roberta Hoskie, local high school guidance supervisor Cynthia Beaver, and doctor Tamiko Jackson McArthur

=== North Haven ===
- October 28, 2022: Kostyantyn and Olga Yermakov, Ukrainian married couple and refugees

== Delaware ==
=== Wilmington ===
- May 4, 1945: James Phillip Connor, U.S. Army sergeant
- April 3, 2009: The Fon of Bamunka

== District of Columbia ==
=== Washington, D.C. ===
- 1951: Douglas MacArthur, American General of the Army
- 1961: Peter Ustinov, British, actor, writer and director
- 2008: Alexander Ovechkin, Russian ice hockey player
- 2009: Mark Ein, American businessman
- 2011: Lamont Peterson, American boxer
- 2011: Raheem DeVaughn, American singer
- 2016: Bryce Harper, American baseball player
- 2017: Dave Chappelle, stand-up comedian
- 2024: Darrell Green, Football player

== Florida ==
=== Bradenton ===
- Philip Givens

=== Cape Coral ===
- December 13, 2015: Jessica Lynch, Prisoner of War, Private First Class (2001 - 2003), was honored and presented with the key to the city of Cape Coral, Florida by Mayor Marni Sawicki at a private dinner held at the Southwest Florida Military Museum & Library with both special and surprise guests in attendance. This was a private event closed to both the public and media.

=== Clearwater ===
- Philip Givens
- George Hill
- 17 January 2012: Frank Crum
- 30 October 2013: Robert Engelman, Film Producer for Alcon Entertainment

=== Coral Gables ===
- 1981: Jeannett Slesnick, Community leader, advocate, philanthropist. Presented by Coral Gables Mayor Bill Chapman.
- 31 August 2018: Jesús Permuy, architect and Cuban community leader. Presented by Coral Gables Mayor Raul Valdes-Fauli during a ceremony in the office of Congresswoman Ileana Ros-Lehtinen. Other participants in the presentation ceremony were Ros-Lehtinen, former Coral Gables Mayor Don Slesnick, and former Miami Mayor Tomás Regalado.
- 11 July 2023: Jeannett Slesnick, received a rare second Key to the City of Coral Gables, presented by Mayor Vince Lago.

=== Doral ===
- September 15, 2013: Henrique Capriles Radonski, Venezuelan opposition leader

=== Dunedin ===
- July 18, 2013: Lari White, country music artist

=== Fort Lauderdale ===
- August 30, 2023: Lionel Messi, soccer player

=== Fort Myers ===
- July 11, 2014: Sammy Watkins, American football wide receiver and Fort Myers native.

=== Gainesville ===
- October 27, 2023: Laura Jane Grace, musician

=== Key West ===
- December 20, 1955: Ethel Waters, singer and actress, was presented with the key to the city on the set of Carib Gold, a film in which she starred.
- December 28, 1955: Dwight D. Eisenhower, 34th President of the United States, received the key to the city during a 12-day vacation in Key West.
- May 22, 1956: Estes Kefauver, U.S. Senator, was given the key to the city while campaigning to be nominated the Democratic presidential candidate.
- February 23, 1957: Harry S. Truman, 33rd President of the United States, received the key to the city and was made honorary chairman of the board of county commissioners.
- July 14, 2004: Rosie O'Donnell, comedian and LGBT rights activist, was given the key to the city during the inaugural voyage of her cruise line, R Family Vacations.

=== Lakeland ===
- February 11, 1976: John McKay received the key to the city upon his appointment as head coach of the Tampa Bay Buccaneers.

=== Miami ===
- 1976: 1st 1 Millionth Passenger ever thru the Port of Miami presented Key to the City of Miami to Deborah Manika.
- 1981: Musical group The Jacksons received keys to the city of Miami.
- 2004: The mayors of Miami-Dade County and the city officially welcomed Shaquille O'Neal and presented him with the keys to the city before a press conference was held in the American Airlines Arena.
- August 9, 2004: Rap Superstar Lil' Kim was awarded the key to the city of Miami (her place of residence at the time) for her contributions to the world of Hip Hop.
- December 6, 2006: Superstar Shakira was awarded the key to the city of Miami for playing 5 shows in AmericanAirlines Arena in one tour, a record she still owns till date.
- August 19, 2009: Miami Commissioner Tomás Regalado presented Armando Perez (aka Pitbull) with the key to the city during a morning ceremony.
- April 13, 2013: Mayor Matti Bower presented the Key to pop singer Adam Lambert for "being brave enough to be openly gay on American Idol."
- July 8, 2013: María Corina Machado, Venezuelan opposition leader
- August 20, 2013: José Sulaimán, president of the World Boxing Council
- September 15, 2013: Henrique Capriles Radonski, Venezuelan opposition leader
- October 29, 2018: Trevor Noah receives key to city and official city proclamation declaring October 29, 2018 Trevor Noah Day.
- August 27, 2019: Mayor Francis Suarez presented the Key to the City of Miami to Natalie Martinez.
- November 15, 2019: Mayor Francis Suarez presented the Key to the City of Miami to Jonathan Davis
- January 12, 2020: Mayor Francis Suarez presented the Key to the City of Miami to Will Smith and Martin Lawrence, and were named honorary police officers of the Miami Police Department
- September 28, 2021: Mayor Francis Suarez presented the Key to the City of Miami to Conor McGregor.
- October 6, 2021: Mayor Francis Suarez presented the Key to the City of Miami to Teresa Murphy.
- October 6, 2021: Mayor Francis Suarez presented the Key to the City of Miami to the 2018 Miami Dade County Francisco R. Walker Teacher of the Year Rudy Diaz.
- May 6, 2023: Mayor Francis Suarez presented the Key to the City of Miami to the Nelk boys (Kyle, Steiny and Bradley Martyn).
- May 31, 2025: Mayor Francis Suarez presented the Key to the City to Fundacion Hermanos de la Calle founders Malena Legarre and Narciso Munoz.
- July 24, 2025: Mayor Francis Suarez presented the Key to the City of Miami to Jesús Permuy.
- October 23, 2025: Mayor Francis Suarez was awarded the key to the City of Miami by the Miami City Council.
- November 5, 2025: Mayor Francis Suarez presented the Key to the City of Miami to Lionel Messi.
- November 5, 2025: Mayor Francis Suarez presented the Key to the City of Miami to Donald J. Trump, president of the United States.
- January 11, 2026: Camila Cabello was honored with the Key to the City of Miami by Miami-Dade County Commissioner Eileen Higgins and local officials during the annual Three Kings Parade on Calle Ocho.

=== North Miami ===
- November 19, 2012: Kim and Kourtney Kardashian, socialites, businesswomen, and models
- June 11, 2013: Gregory Toussaint, Pastor
- July 30, 2025: Kodak Black received the key to the city of North Miami.

=== Ocala ===
- 2 March 2007: John Travolta, American Actor
- 2 March 2007: Kelly Preston, American Actress
- 2017: A Day to Remember
- 25 September 2020: Juanita Perry Cunningham, City resident, educator and civic activist

=== Orlando ===
- 8 October 1998: Backstreet Boys
- 8 January 2018: 2017 UCF Knights football team
- 22 September 2023: Brightline founder Wes Edens

=== Pensacola ===
- 15 November 2016: Addison Russell, Professional Baseball Player for the World Series Champion Chicago Cubs.

=== Pompano Beach ===
- July 8, 2025: Kodak Black, Grammy-nominated rapper and philanthropist from Pompano Beach for his ongoing philanthropic contributions to the city of Pompano Beach.
- 2023: Stockar McDougle: Grand Marshal Yuletide, longtime Pompano Beach resident and former player for the Pompano Chiefs and Cowboys. Gives back to the City through the football program and helps local kids through the McDougle Training Institute (MTI) which is also located in Pompano Beach.
- 2019: Jesse Vassallo: A highly accomplished swimmer and current head coach of the Pompano Beach Piranhas swim team. He is a multiple world record holder and US Olympian, inducted into the International Swimming Hall of Fame. He has coached the Piranhas since 2011.
- 2018: Victoria Burgess: Grand Marshal of Yuletide Parade; resident and employee that successfully paddled from Cuba to Key West.

=== Sarasota ===
- April 25, 2013: Paul Thorpe, Sarasota citizen and founding member of the Downtown Association of Sarasota
- September 11, 2013: Diana Ross, singer and actress

=== St. Petersburg ===
- 1972: Philip Givens

=== Tallahassee ===
- November 14, 2018: Joshua Quick, awarded key to the city by Mayor Gillum for confronting and attempting to stop a shooter at a yoga studio.
- January 9, 2023: DJ DEMP, awarded the key to the city by Mayor John E. Dailey for Outstanding Service to the City of Tallahassee.

=== Tampa ===
- January 28, 2003: Jon Gruden, head coach of the Tampa Bay Buccaneers, received the key to the city following the Buccaneers' Super Bowl XXXVII victory.
- April 10, 2023: Mayor Jane Castor bestowed the key to the city to Taylor Swift in honor of her upcoming performances for The Eras Tour. Swift was also named Honorary Mayor and many public places were lit up red, in tribute to Swift's Red album.
- March 6, 2025: Castor gave the key to the city to NFL cornerback Isaiah Rodgers, a Tampa native and member of the 2024 Philadelphia Eagles team that won Super Bowl LIX.

== Georgia ==
=== Franklin Springs ===
- 2007: The Governor of Georgia, Sonny Perdue, received the key to the city of Franklin Springs after visiting the city and cutting the ribbon to the city's new Public Safety and City Hall buildings; the original buildings were destroyed in 2004 by Hurricane Ivan.

=== Milton ===
- 2007: The original Governor's Commission for the City of Milton (Ron Wallace, Brandon Beach, Gregory Mishkin, Dan Phalan and Cecil Pruitt) was awarded the key to the city of Milton in recognition of their work in the creation of the city. They were also presented a proclamation that officially declares December 1 as "Commissioning Day" in honor of their achievements and recognizes the five men as the "Founding Fathers" of the city.

=== Dawsonville ===
- November 9, 2020: 2020 NASCAR Cup Series Champion Chase Elliott received the key to the city of Dawsonville, Georgia as a way to celebrate the 24 year old Dawsonville native's first championship at the highest level of motorsports.

=== Taylorsville ===
- April 28, 2023: Singer-songwriter Taylor Swift was presented with the key to the town of Taylorsville, GA in honor of three sold out nights of The Eras Tour at the Mercedes-Benz Stadium in Atlanta.

=== Warner Robins ===
- 1980: Major William Donald "Bud" Nelson of the Canadian Military was presented the key to the city for his role in rescuing six American diplomats who had evaded capture during the seizure of the United States embassy in Tehran, Iran, on November 4, 1979. It was dubbed the Canadian Caper.

== Hawaii ==
=== Honolulu ===
- 12 December 2014: Michelle Wie, American Golfer.

== Illinois ==
=== Chicago ===
- December 30, 1871: Grand Duke Alexei Alexandrovich of Russia received the "Freedom of the City of Chicago".
- June 26, 1933: Residents of the Midget Village at the Century of Progress World's Fair were presented with a key to the City of Chicago by Mayor Edward Joseph Kelly.
- June 4, 1934: Three-division world boxing champion Barney Ross was awarded the key to the city by Mayor Edward Joseph Kelly shortly after defeating Jimmy McLarnin for the welterweight championship.
- August 17, 1970: As part of Chicago's Lakefront Festival, Mayor Richard J. Daley awarded a key to the City of Chicago to Edward Stein, who had emerged from the Chicago River dressed as Neptune to lead a parade.
- May 1985: Jean McFadden, leader of the Glasgow District Council was presented a key to the City of Chicago by Joel Hall as part of Glasgow's Mayfest
- April 21, 1988: Michael Jackson was awarded the Key to the city by Eugene Sawyer.
- March 20, 1990: Audrey Hepburn was presented with a key to the City of Chicago by Mayor Richard M. Daley.
- October 12, 1990: Sophia Loren was presented with a key to the City of Chicago by Mayor Richard M. Daley.
- 1996: The famous Lebanese Arab singer Najwa Karam was presented with the Key to the City of Chicago.
- May 29, 2026: Pope Leo XIV was presented with a key to the City of Chicago by Mayor Brandon Johnson.

=== North Chicago ===
- July 11, 2011: Shawn Marion, basketball player with the Dallas Mavericks, was awarded the key to the city following the Mavericks' victory at the 2011 NBA Finals.

=== Springfield ===
- March 11, 2015: Mayor J. Michael Houston awarded the Key to the city to Cobra Commander from G.I. Joe in honor of the G.I. JoeCon convention taking place the following month.

=== Bensenville ===
- June 22, 2018: Village President Frank DeSimone, Village Manager Evan K. Summers, and Chief of Police Frank Kosman, presented Keys to the Village to Cónsul General Billy Adolfo José Muñoz Miranda and Vice Cónsul Brenda Paz de Ghassemi from the Consulate General of Guatemala.

=== Sterling ===
- December 23, 2024: Mayor Diana Merdian awarded the Key to the City of Sterling to former Nebraska Cornhusker volleyball player and current LOVB Omaha player Lexi Rodriguez.

== Indiana ==
=== Evansville ===
- April 23, 2009: Singer-songwriter Taylor Swift was presented with the key to Evansville as thanks for choosing Evansville as the opening night her 2009-2010 Fearless Tour.
- Fall, 2012: Air show demonstration team owner and pilot Gareth Long was awarded the key for his philanthropy actions.

=== Gary ===
- April 22, 1959: Martin Luther King Jr. was given the key to the city.
- June 11, 2003: Artist Michael Jackson received keys to the city of Gary from Mayor Scott King.
- May 2, 2025: Bernice A. King, activist and daughter of Martin Luther King Jr., was given the key to the city by Mayor Eddie Melton.

=== Indianapolis ===
- July 17, 2015: Reggie Wayne, wide receiver for the Indianapolis Colts NFL football team receives a key to the city of Indianapolis

=== Salem ===
- November 11, 1999: Disability advocate Gary Gambino received the key to the city of Salem from Mayor Douglas Campbell.

=== South Bend ===
- 2012: Comedian Jerry Seinfeld received the key to the city from Mayor Pete Buttigieg.

=== Terre Haute ===
- September 27, 2024: America's Got Talent season 19 winner Richard Goodall received the key to the city from Chief of Staff to the Mayor Jesse Tohill.

== Iowa ==
=== Des Moines ===
- 21 October 2006: Bill Bryson, Author

== Kansas ==
=== Lyons ===
- April 2022: Marshall Christmann, received the Key to the city for 20 plus years of philanthropic contributions to people of Lyons, Kansas, and for numerous negotiations between governmental agencies for those same citizens, Presented by Mayor Dustin Schultz.

== Kentucky ==
=== Bowling Green ===
- August 26, 2004: Dionne Warwick, singer, received the key to the city prior to her appearance at an Athena Cage concert.

=== Middletown ===
- February, 2026: Isaac McCray, Lifeguard, Cadet Colonel in the Elite Corps Independent Cadet Unit under the R.I.C.C.A. (Regional Independent Cadet Corps received the key to the city of Middletown Kentucky, after voluntarily rendering first-aid and comfort to an injured young passenger involved in a severe automobile accident before emergency crews could arrive.

=== Louisville ===
- 1975: Helen Humes, musician, received the key to the city for her extensive musical career.
- 1990s: Frederick Cease, soldier, received the key to the city for his extensive military service.
- July, 2000: Nancy Johnson Barker, singer, received the key to the city after the 25th anniversary of the Kentucky Music Weekend Festival.
- 2002: Ivor Chodkowski, farmer, received the key to the city for working to start a farmer's market in Louisville's "food desert."
- September 24, 2002: Montgomery Gentry, musicians, received the key to the city for their musical career.
- January 2010: Sam Leist, lawyer, received the key to the city for his career in public service.
- March 12, 2016: Bryson Tiller, singer, received the key to the city by the city's mayor, Greg Fischer, as well as a holiday on March 12, called "Bryson Tiller Day." This all occurred at his T R A P S O U L concert.
- April 5, 2016: Awadeya Mahmoud, human rights worker, received the key to the city by Greg Fischer, upon her receiving the International Women of Courage Award.
- June 29, 2016: John Rabun, social worker, received the key to the city by Greg Fischer, for his work as the head of the National Center for Missing and Exploited Children.
- January 10, 2017: Bob Beatty, American football Coach, received the key to the city by Greg Fischer, after winning Trinity High School's 24th state football title.

=== Williamsburg ===
- January 16, 2019: Nick Wilson, public defender, was awarded the key to the city after winning Survivor: David vs. Goliath.

== Louisiana ==
=== Lafayette ===
- May 2019: Former professional mixed martial arts fighter Dustin Poirier was awarded the key to the city of Lafayette by Mayor-President Joel Robideaux for his work with the Good Fight Foundation and his contributions to the community.

=== New Orleans ===
- November 21, 2006: Kentucky-New Orleans Architecture Studio was awarded the key to the city of New Orleans for its work on restoration and re-design efforts of Mickey Markey Park in Bywater.
- April 26, 2007: The Harris County Hospital District was awarded the key to the city in recognition of its efforts to provide health care to Hurricane Katrina evacuees at its Astrodome Clinic in September 2005.
- June 2008: Atlanta native, R&B Singer Usher awarded the key to the city for his effort and dedication to help rebuild New Orleans after Hurricane Katrina.
- September 25, 2011: Former New Orleans Saints safety Steve Gleason was granted the key to the city for his blocked punt against the Atlanta Falcons in the Saints' first home game after Hurricane Katrina.
- September 17, 2018: August 21, 2018: Beyoncé and Jay-Z received the key to the city for their philanthropy work and impact on popular culture.
- May 20, 2019: Jesseca Dupart was awarded the key to the city to recognize the philanthropy and business she had contributed to in the area.
- November 2, 2024: Lil Wayne, during the Lil WeezyAna Fest, received a key to the city from New Orleans Mayor LaToya Cantrell.
- December 18, 2025: Alan Nobili, Executive Director of the Alliance Française of New Orleans, was awarded the Key to the City of New Orleans in recognition of his contributions to cultural diplomacy and the promotion of the French language and Francophone heritage in Louisiana.

== Maine ==
=== Portland ===
- March, 2003: Dr Gerry McKenna, President of the University of Ulster, in recognition of promoting research and economic linkages between Northern Ireland and Maine
- July 13, 2008: moe., a band from upstate New York, was presented the key to the city in recognition of a two-day fundraising concert they organised for the Preble Street Resource Center.
- June 13, 2014: Evander Holyfield, American Boxer
- November 4, 2023: Twisted Roots, Rock band

== Maryland ==
=== Baltimore ===
- September 10, 2012: Keys to the city were awarded to eight athletes who competed in the 2012 Summer Olympics: swimmers Michael Phelps (key revoked 2014) and Katie Ledecky, rower David Banks, windsurfer Farrah Hall, cyclist Bobby Lea, field hockey player Katie O'Donnell, kayaker Scott Parsons, and modern pentathlete Suzanne Stettinius.
- July 24, 2019: Gervonta Davis, three days before his homecoming fight with Ricardo Nunez – his fifth 130-pound world title defense – he was presented the keys to the city by then mayor Bernard C. "Jack" Young in a ceremony at City Hall.
- July 19, 2023: Angel Reese, college basketball player, was awarded the Key to the city by Mayor Brandon Scott.

=== Hagerstown ===
- LA Knight, professional wrestler, was awarded the Key to the city by Mayor Tekesha Martinez.

=== Pocomoke City ===
- Ray Lewis, NFL Hall of Famer.

== Massachusetts ==
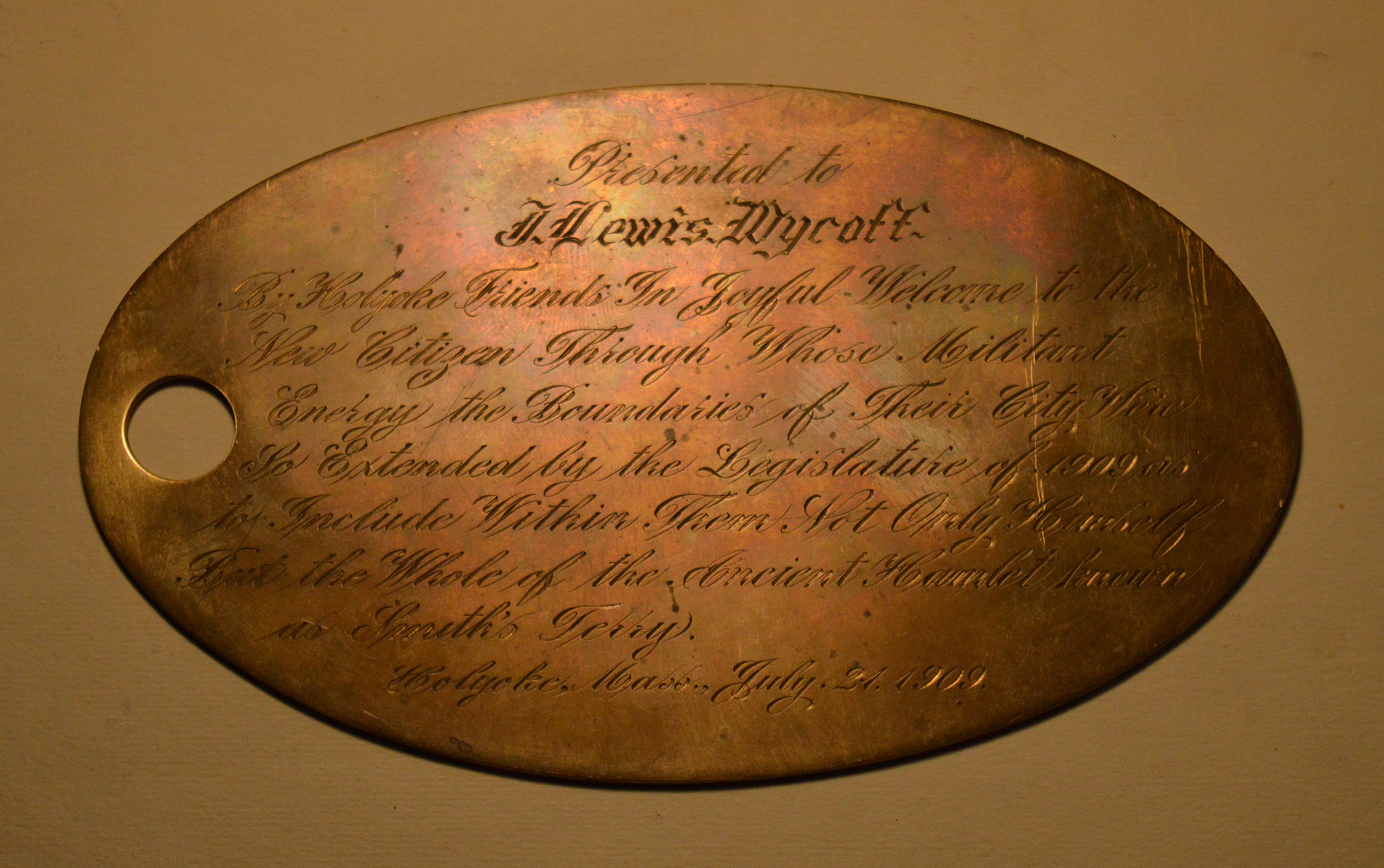
Plaque from the Key to the City given to Joseph L. Wyckoff for working with the Legislature to petition the annexation of Mount Tom and Smith's Ferry for the city of Holyoke

=== Brockton ===
- September 29, 1980: Boxer Marvin Hagler was crowned World Middleweight Champion of September 27, and received the key to the city on his return to his hometown.

=== Dedham ===
- July 1961: Connie Hines received the Key to the Town after being cast on Mister Ed.

=== Holyoke ===
- July 21, 1909: Mayor Nathan P. Avery awarded Joseph Lewis Wyckoff the Key to the city, "through whose militant energy the boundaries of their city were so extended by the Legislature of 1909 as to include within them not only himself but the whole of the ancient hamlet known as Smith's Ferry."
- April 27, 2018: Mayor Alex B. Morse presented Carmen Yulín Cruz the Key to the city to honor that "in such a time of despair [she] provided a beacon of hope and opportunity for Puerto Ricans".

=== Worcester ===
- July 8, 2017: Mayor of Worcester Joseph Petty presented Shatta Wale with the key to the city, in recognition of his contributions to the arts and for honoring the city of Worcester, Massachusetts with his presence.

== Michigan ==
=== Albion ===
- 1960s: Ann Landers received the key to the city of Albion upon her visit to Starr Commonwealth for Boys.

=== Detroit ===
- November 27, 1924: Since its first proceedings in 1924, Santa Claus has received the key to the city of Detroit annually during the cities America's Thanksgiving Parade.
- October 13, 1963: In honor of (the since past) holiday "Paper Boy Day" Jerry Wayne Gresham at age 16 was the youngest person to receive the key to the city of Detroit (& possibly the first) by then mayor Cavanagh.
- May 15, 1974: Mayor Coleman Young gave keys to the city to the activist Angela Davis and other participants in a conference held by the National Alliance Against Racist and Political Repression.
- September 26, 1974: Stevie Wonder, renowned Motown recording artist was awarded a key to the city by then Mayor Coleman Young.
- August 1975: Horace Jackson, filmmaker, was honored with a key to the city for his film Deliver Us From Evil with Detroit City Council member Emma Henderson stating "Mr. Jackson has produced a film the entire family can enjoy" and recognized him one of the pioneers of Black films in the sixties and seventies.
- July 8, 1977: Actor Hal Linden, known for his role playing the titular policeman on Barney Miller, visited the 12th precinct of the Detroit Police Department and received keys to the city.
- September 30, 1980: The filmmaker and oceanographer Jacques Cousteau was helicoptered ashore from a research vessel in the Great Lakes to be honored with keys to Detroit.
- 1980: Saddam Hussein, president of Iraq at that time, was awarded the key to the city and declared "an honorary citizen of Detroit" for his gift of $250,000 to fund the construction of Sacred Heart Chaldean Church, a Catholic ministry that served many Iraqis. While receiving the keys, Hussein presented Sacred Heart's pastor with an additional $200,000 to pay remaining debts.
- January 31, 2006: Detroit native Jerome Bettis was awarded the key to the city by Mayor Kwame Kilpatrick days before his Super Bowl win.
- January 2, 2007: Steve Yzerman received the key to the city after his retirement and having his jersey retired.
- January 27, 2010: Sesame Street star Elmo received the key to the city from Mayor David Bing during a visit with kids at Children's Hospital of Michigan.
- October 22, 2014: Berry Gordy received the key to the city from Mayor Mike Duggan for his work of Motown
- April 1, 2017: Big Sean received the key to the city from Mayor Mike Duggan for setting up a foundation called "Mogul Prep" that teaches kids all the behind the scenes jobs available in the music industry.
- June 15, 2018: The Jackson 5 members, Jackie, Tito, Jermaine, Marlon, and Michael were honored with keys to the city at the Detroit Music Weekend festival; Michael's was posthumous.
- February 29, 2020: Members of the Detroit Youth Choir received keys to the city.

=== Pontiac ===
- April 21, 2026: DDG (Darryl Granberry Jr.) received his key to the city from Mayor Mike McGuinness, Council President Austin and Councilman Jackson backstage at the Opening of his "Blame The Chat" tour.

=== Flint ===
- 1989: Lois M. Craig received the key to the city of Flint.
- June 10, 2007: American Idol finalist LaKisha Jones received a proclamation and key to the city from Mayor Don Williamson.
- September 15, 2012: Claressa Shields, Five division (three division undisputed) world champion and two-time Olympic gold medalist boxer.

=== Jackson ===
- 2023: Pastor James Hines and businessman and philanthropist Al Glick of Alro Steel received keys to the city from Mayor Daniel Mahoney. Glick received the award posthumously.

=== Kalamazoo ===
- May 7, 2009: Kalamazoo native and "American Idol" fifth place finalist Matt Giraud. "Giraud was presented with a key to the city by Kalamazoo Mayor Bobby Hopewell, and Gov. Jennifer Granholm proclaimed May 7 'Matt Giraud Day' "https://www.mlive.com/music/2009/05/idol_contestant_matt_giraud_re.html
- December 17, 2018: Kalamazoo native Julian Ravi Cosmin Borst receive the key to the city of Kalamazoo from former Mayor Bobby J Hopewell, for the three gold medals he won in the national games of the Special Olympics.
- November 11, 2019 Longtime members of the Kalamazoo City Commission, Bobby Hopewell and Don Cooney, had their final meeting as members of the commission Monday night and received keys to the city during proclamations to honor them by new Mayor David Anderson.

April 13, 2025: Western Michigan University's men's hockey team brought the NCAA national championship trophy home to Lawson Ice Arena on Sunday, April 13 a day after winning the school's first national title in the sport. A small, shiny gold key to the city of Kalamazoo will now join the trophy in a display case at the university.

=== Sault Sainte Marie ===
- July 22, 2007: Kiss (band) received the key to the city of Sault Ste Marie.

=== Southfield ===
- May 16, 2025: Selma Blair, actress and Southfield native.

=== Traverse City ===
- 2005: Traverse City native Carter Oosterhouse received a key to the city from Mayor Linda Smyka.

== Missouri ==
Jefferson City

- July 16, 2022: Rock band Buckcherry was awarded the Key to the city by Mayor Carrie Tergin.

• Muralist Ray Harvey receives Hannibal, MO key to the city on November 7, 2023, recognizing his work in Hannibal concerning 25 completed murals.

== Nebraska ==
=== Omaha ===
- March 2014: Boxing World Champion and Omaha native Terence Crawford received the key to the city and the Omaha city council declared Tuesday, March 4, 2014, as Terence "Bud" Crawford Day.
  - September 27, 2025: Crawford was again presented with the key to the city, this time by Mayor John Ewing Jr. shortly after defeating Canelo Álvarez and becoming a three-division undisputed world champion.

== Nevada ==
=== Fernley ===
- August 2012: Jacob Dalton, American Olympic Gymnast (2012).

=== Las Vegas ===
- 1999: Lebanese recording artist Fairuz received the key to the city of Las Vegas
- October 25, 2003: Artist Michael Jackson received keys to the city of Las Vegas from Mayor Oscar Goodman.
- 2007: Lord Taylor of Warwick received the Key to Las Vegas as well as every September there is an official Lord Taylor of Warwick Day.
- 2012: Canadian, business person, Elise Diker received the key to the city of Las Vegas gifted by her husband & international philanthropist, Mark Diker and Mayor Oscar Goodman in honor of her passion and love for the city.
- 2012: Lebanese recording artist Nancy Ajram received the key to the city of Las Vegas.
- 2012: Legendary Reggae Group Black Uhuru (Ducky Simpson) was honored with the key to the city of Las Vegas and August 31 was officially declared Black Uhuru Day in Las Vegas.
- 2014: On October 24, Small business owner, HIV/AIDS Activist & Trevor Project Supervisor saving over 200 GLBTQ lives from suicide Bobby A Townsend-Valenzuela) was honored, and received the key to the State of Nevada and the key to the City of Las Vegas
- 2014: On November 5, American singer Britney Spears was honored, and received the key to the city of Las Vegas.
- 2015: Professional baseball players Bryce Harper and Kris Bryant received keys to the city of Las Vegas
- 2016: Professional DJ, record producer, radio personality, and record label executive DJ Khaled received keys to the city of Las Vegas
- 2016: Property Brothers' Jonathan and Drew Scott earn receive keys to the city of Las Vegas after their contributions towards charity
- 2017: On September 3, Ultralight Team members and creators of Bats & Butterflies LV, Anthony C. Flores and Isaiah J. LaBelle received keys to the city of Las Vegas
- 2018: On July 6, UFC president Dana White received keys to the city of Las Vegas
- April 30, 2019: Panic! at the Disco vocalist Brendon Urie received the key to the city of Las Vegas for his accomplishments in music.
- September 6, 2019: Pop rock band Imagine Dragons received the key to Las Vegas in honor of their musical accomplishment and charity work towards fighting pediatric cancer with the Tyler Robinson Foundation.
- May 2, 2019: James Holzhauer was awarded a key to the Las Vegas Strip for his success on Jeopardy! and donations to children's charity organizations and other nonprofit organizations in the Las Vegas area.
- April 16, 2022: Viva Las Vegas Rockabilly Weekend promoter Tom Ingram was presented with a ceremonial key to Las Vegas at The Orleans Hotel & Casino
- April 22, 2022: RuPaul received the keys to the city for his unprecedented career in showbusiness and for making RuPaul's Drag Race Live! one of the hottest shows on the Las Vegas Strip. The day was also proclaimed RuPaul Day.
- June 8, 2022: Katy Perry was awarded the keys for Las Vegas Strip in the honor of her residency "PLAY".
- July 5, 2022: Australia's Thunder from Down Under received the keys to the city after 20 years of their Las Vegas Residency.
- June 22, 2023: Anetra received the keys to the city for outstandingly representing Las Vegas drag queens on RuPaul's Drag Race's fifteenth season. Making June 22 Anetra day.
- October 17, 2023: Usher, musician
- March 2, 2024: U2 received a key to the Las Vegas Strip prior to the final show of their U2:UV Achtung Baby Live at Sphere concert residency.
- October 30, 2024: Justin Woo and Lydia Ansel of Vegas Justice League received a Key to The Las Vegas Strip by Sheriff Kevin McMahill and Commissioner Michael Naft.
- June 11, 2026: Restaurateur Lisa Vanderpump was presented a Key to The Strip by Clark County Commissioner Tick Segerblom for her first venture as a hotelier at the grand opening of The Vanderpump Hotel.

== New Jersey ==
=== Atlantic City ===
- c. 1927-1930: Arthur A. Quinn, state senator and union leader
- June 21, 2013: Mallory Hagan, winner of Miss America 2013
- July 20, 2019: Ronny Colson American Grammy Award winning music producer
- July 20, 2019: Luke Witherspoon III, American Music Producer, Philanthropist.

=== Belleville ===
- 2025: My Chemical Romance (Ray Toro, Mikey Way, Gerard Way, Frank Iero)

=== Camden County ===
- 2000: Britney Spears

=== Englewood ===
- 2019: Juwann Winfree, American football player

=== Essex County ===
- January 8, 2020: Shakur Stevenson, Olympic silver medalist and World Champion professional boxer.

=== Hoboken ===
- October 30, 1947: Frank Sinatra, American Singer and Actor.
- July 6, 1998: Aaron Rosa, drummer of the rock band Palisades.

=== Jersey City ===
- March 17, 1961: Brendan Behan, Irish playwright and author, received the keys to Jersey City from Mayor Charles Witkowski.
- April 27, 2023: Dan Hurley University of Connecticut men's basketball coach

=== Newark ===
- 2016: Professor Don Jacob, Martial Artist, Grandmaster

=== Paterson ===
- April 15, 2012: Victor Cruz (American football) of the New York Giants was awarded the key to the city of Paterson for his role in the Super Bowl XLVI victory over the New England Patriots.
- August 28, 2015: Rapper Fetty Wap was given the key to the city of his hometown Paterson, New Jersey by Mayor Jose "Joey" Torres.
- June 1, 2018: US Senator Cory Booker was given the key to the city of Paterson by Mayor Jane Williams-Warren for his service to the state of New Jersey.
- May 25, 2022: Mayor Andre Sayegh presented Felisa Van Liew, Principal of Public School No. 2, with Paterson's Key to the City
- February 7, 2025: Mayor Andre Sayegh presented the key to the city to outgoing Business Administrator Kathleen Long as she departed municipal government for a position at the New Jersey Department of Community Affairs.

=== Union City ===
- March 1, 2025: Richardson Hitchins, World Champion professional boxer.

== New Mexico ==
=== Albuquerque ===
- October 23, 2025: English rock band Judas Priest received the key to the city of Albuquerque.

== New York ==
=== Buffalo ===
- November 6, 1981: To symbolize the city's appreciation for Triumph's music and loyalty to Buffalo, Mayor James D. Griffin presented the Key and certificate of commemoration to members Rik Emmett and Gil Moore. In exchange, the band gifted Mayor Griffin with an official Allied Forces tour jacket.
- May 19, 2009: Terrell Owens received the key to the city of Buffalo with the provisions that he catch a minimum of 10 touchdown passes for the Buffalo Bills and lead the team into the NFL Playoffs. He caught 5 touchdowns and the Bills did not make the playoffs.
- November 6, 2014: Terry Pegula received the key to the city of Buffalo, as a result of his purchase of the Buffalo Sabres, Buffalo Bills and Buffalo Bandits professional sports teams and his construction of the HarborCenter complex.
- November 14, 2025: Dion Dawkins received the key to the city of Buffalo in recognition of his contributions to the city, including his non-profit organization Dion's Dreamers.

=== New York City ===
- June 27, 1702: Viscount Cornbury was presented the "Freedom of the City".
- September 1735: Andrew Hamilton received the "Freedom of the City" for his defence of John Peter Zenger.
- February 25, 1902: Prince Henry of Prussia was presented the Freedom of the City during a visit to New York.
- 1927: The aviator Charles Lindbergh was awarded the key to the city following his record-breaking non-stop flight from New York to Paris.

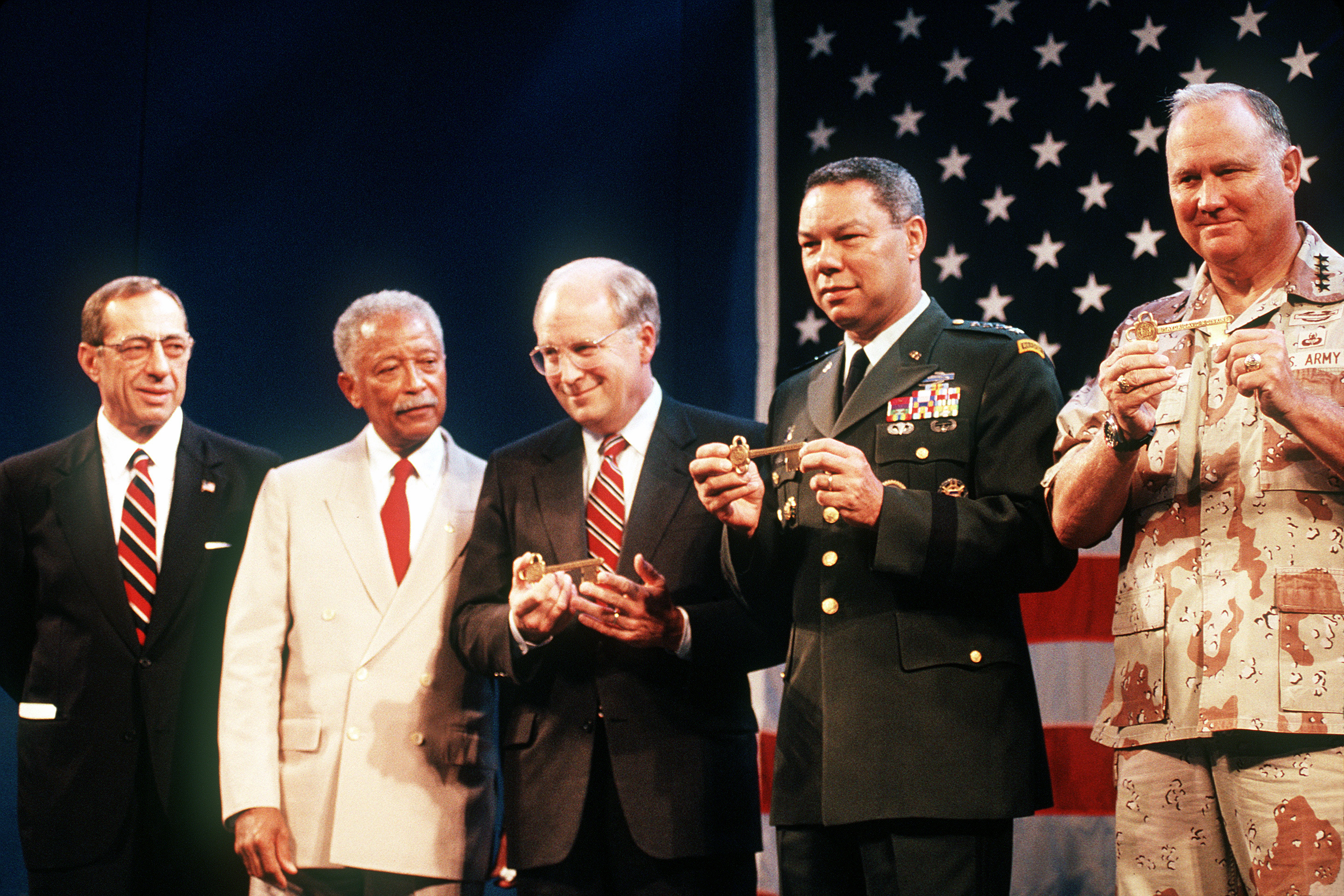
Keys to New York City 1991

- 1930-1931: Albert Einstein was given the keys to the city by Mayor Jimmy Walker.
- 1969: Irish Civil Rights Activist Bernadette Devlin received honorary keys to the city in 1969 from Mayor Lindsay whilst on tour in America to raise money for the civil rights movement in Northern Ireland. As the tour came to a close Devlin became disenfranchised with Irish Americans who struggled to see the parallel of the civil rights movement in the U.S. with that in Ireland. The following year she gave the key to friend and fellow activist Eamonn McCann who presented it to Robert Bay of the Black Panthers on her behalf as a show of solidarity.
- 1972: Musical group The Jackson 5 received keys to the city of New York from Deputy Mayor Edward Hamilton.
- June 10, 1991: Richard Cheney, Colin Powell, Norman Schwarzkopf after a ticker-tape parade up the Canyon of Heroes in lower Manhattan as part of Welcome Home celebration for Desert Storm forces.
- February 5, 2008: The New York Giants players, coaches and owners received keys to the city in recognition of their victory at Super Bowl XLII. Presentation took place at City Hall after a ticker-tape parade up the Canyon of Heroes in lower Manhattan.
- February 9, 2009: Chesley B. Sullenberger III received the key to the city for safely landing US Airways Flight 1549 in the Hudson River after mid-air faults from a bird collision, saving the lives of all 155 people on board. The First Officer of the Flight, Jeffrey B. Skiles, and flight attendants Sheila Dail, Doreen Welsh and Donna Dent also received keys to the city.
- May 8, 2009: Captain Richard Phillips and crewman William Rios received keys to the city in recognition of their heroism aboard the MV Maersk Alabama during the 2009 hijacking by Somali pirates.
- November 6, 2009: The New York Yankees players, coaches and owners received keys to the city in recognition of their 2009 World Series victory.
- October 14, 2010: Ralph Lauren received a key for his philanthropic and economic contributions to the city.
- November 18, 2011: Regis Philbin received a key to the city to honor his twenty-eight year contribution to New York media.
- February 7, 2012: The New York Giants players, coaches and owners received keys to the city in recognition of their victory at Super Bowl XLVI. Presentation took place at City Hall after a ticker-tape parade up the Canyon of Heroes in lower Manhattan.
- July 10, 2015: The United States Women's National Soccer Team players and coaches received keys to the city in recognition of their 2015 Women's World Cup victory. The parade was organized on short notice and was the first ticker-tape parade in New York City to honor female athletes since Olympic Athletes in 1984.
- January 9, 2016: Ray Pfeifer FDNY Firefighter received the Key to the City of New York for his work to help secure health care for over 80,000 9/11/01 first responders. The James Zadroga 9/11 Health and Compensation Act was signed into law on December 18, 2015
- March 2, 2016: Rapper Foxy Brown was honored by Mayor Bill de Blasio and awarded the Key to the City.
- June 11, 2017: Rapper Fabolous and the late artist Jean-Michel Basquiat were awarded keys to the city by Brooklyn Borough President Eric Adams at the Brooklyn Botanic Garden.
- June 26, 2017: Rapper Nicki Minaj was honored by the Queens Borough President Melinda Katz and awarded the Key to the City for her outstanding career achievements in music.
- December 27, 2021: Musician, poet, and author Patti Smith was awarded Key to the City by Mayor Bill de Blasio. Patti Smith and Lenny Kaye performed at the ceremony.
- August 8, 2022: LL Cool J was awarded the Key to the City during the Rock the Bells festival in Queens.
- January 2023: Aaron Judge was awarded the Key to the City by Eric Adams for his historic achievement in breaking the AL home run record set by Roger Maris in 1961, by hitting 62 home runs.
- April 14, 2023: Lord Andrew Lloyd Webber was awarded the Key to the City by Eric Adams for his contributions of music in Broadway shows such as The Phantom of the Opera and Bad Cinderella
- June 8, 2023: Robert De Niro, actor, awarded the Key to the City during the annual Tribeca Festival.
- July 16, 2023: Valerie Simpson, musician, was awarded the Key to the City at the 22nd St. Albans Jazz and Rhythm & Blues Festival.
- September 15, 2023: Sean "Diddy" Combs was awarded the Key to the City by Eric Adams; the key would later be rescinded on June 16, 2024, due to sexual misconduct allegations against Combs.
- October 24, 2024: The members of the New York Liberty team, who won the 2024 WNBA Finals, were awarded a key to the city.
- November 23, 2025: The members of the 2025 Gotham FC team, who won the 2025 NWSL Championship, were awarded the Key to the City from Mayor Eric Adams.
- June 18, 2026: The members of the New York Knicks team, who won the 2026 NBA Finals, were awarded the Key to the City from Mayor Zohran Mamdani.

=== Oyster Bay ===
- October 19, 2023: Billy Joel, musician from Oyster Bay

=== Rochester ===
- June 25, 1968: Borussia Dortmund, a German professional association football team.
- June 17, 1973: Pelé, Brazilian professional footballer
- June 3, 2013: The Rochester Knighthawks, a professional lacrosse team
- April 23, 2016: Beverly Bond, producer, writer, serial entrepreneur, philanthropist and celebrity DJ, received a key to the city for her contribution to the African American community by empowering and positively impacting the lives of young Black girls through her organization-Black Girls Rock!
- March 19, 2019: John P. Schreiber received the Key to the City of Rochester, N.Y. for his 30 years of dedicated service to the city, culminating as Fire Chief or "Car 1". Under his watch, Rochester became an ISO Class 1 city for fire protection, making the Rochester Fire Department one of the best in the country.

=== Binghamton ===
- August 12, 2007: Dusan Vemic, a professional tennis player on the ATP world tour was given a key to the city in recognition of his fair play and contribution to the sport.
- September 28, 2016: Albert Fiori, Doug Kumpon, Ed Staff, Fred Teribury, and Chris White were all given a key to the city in recognition of saving the life of a person trapped inside a burning vehicle.
- November 22, 2021: John Hughes, Jr, owner of the Binghamton Rumble Ponies was given a key to the city in recognition of stopping the Minor League Baseball team from relocating in 2015 and working with Major League Baseball, the New York Mets and elected officials from the State of New York assuring affiliated Minor League Baseball in Binghamton, NY for decades to come.

=== Monroe County ===
- November 29, 2025: Ernie Clement

== North Carolina ==
=== Boone ===
- January 21, 1980: Special Olympics North Carolina
- July 5, 1983: The Motor Maids

=== Charlotte ===
- Stephen Curry, professional basketball player for the Golden State Warriors of the National Basketball Association (NBA) and fellow Charlottean received the Key to the city from Mayor Vi Lyles in 2022.

=== Fayetteville ===
- May 27, 2025: J. Harrison Ghee, actor, singer, and dancer.

=== Hickory ===
- November 19, 2021: Sheri Everts, Chancellor of Appalachian State University.

=== High Point ===
- Billy Quick, a High Point native and a Special Olympics athlete and ambassador.
- October 13, 2017: Kathy Ireland, American model and actress, turned author and entrepreneur; received the key from High Point mayor Bill Bencini.
- December 3, 2023: Danny and Dolly Jennings were given a Key to the city from High Point Mayor Jay Wagner. This was in honor of all they have done for High Point. They are owners of Bicycle Toy and Hobby Sales.
- June 16, 2024:Fantasia Barrino was given a key to the city in honor of her music career

=== Huntersville ===
- March 15, 2021: Two teenagers, Owen and Walker, were awarded keys to the city for alerting authorities to the 2020 Colonial Pipeline oil spill.

=== Wilmington ===
- June 20, 2013: Stephen King, author, was awarded the Key to the City at an advance screening of the CBS series Under the Dome, based on a novel by King.
- March 28, 2025: Alex Highsmith, NFL linebacker.

== Ohio ==
=== Akron ===
- May 28, 2016: Mark Mothersbaugh, artist and Devo founder, was awarded the key to the city during a ceremony at the Akron-Summit County Public Library.

=== Columbus ===
- May 26, 2005: Fatty Koo, singers songwriter Music group
- Jan 26, 2025: Ryan Day, Ohio State Head Coach, 2025 National Champion

=== Toledo ===
- 1896: Guy G. Major Mayor of Toledo Presented with all brass key to the city.
- 1962: Glass Key to the City of Toledo, Don Constantino de la Cruz-Sanchez, President of the Chamber of Commerce of Toledo (Spain, Europe).
- May 13, 2010: Crystal Bowersox, singer-songwriter and actress, was given the key to the city after reaching the finals of American Idol.
- August 28, 2022: Larry Fuller, jazz pianist from Toledo, Ohio, was given the glass key to the city "For Excellence in Jazz Music and Headlining the Inaugural Glass City Jazz Festival".

=== Cincinnati ===
- 1974: Pramukh Swami Maharaj, President and Spiritual head of BAPS
- 1987: Todd Hobbs, Mark Hobbs, Kevin Hodge, Teddy Hodge, Scott Castellenas, and Chris Hudson, local citizens who saved 11 children from a fire.
- 1988: Nam June Paik, sculptor, at the unveiling of Metrobot on "Robot Day"
- 2015: Cate Blanchett, Australian Actress.
- 2015: Rooney Mara, American Actress.
- 2015: Christine Vachon, American Film Producer.
- 2015: Sir Elton John CBE, British Singer.
- 2015: Lionel Richie, American Singer.
- 2015: Jennifer Hudson, American Actress and Singer.
- 2015: Carl Hilding Severinsen, American Musician and Bandleader on The Tonight Show Starring Johnny Carson.
- 2015: Drew Lachey, American Singer.
- 2015: Nick Lachey, American Singer.
- 2016: Okyeame Kwame, Ghanaian Musician.
- 2018: Jack White, American Musician.
- 2019: Rose Lavelle, American Soccer Player.
- 2023: Richard (Dick) Rosenthal, American Philanthropist
- 2024: John F. Barrett, Chairman President & CEO of Western & Southern Financial Group.

=== Cleveland ===
- 1968: B.B. King, American blues singer, guitarist, songwriter, and record producer
- 1969: Carl B. Stokes, American Politician, Civil Rights Leader, First African American Mayor of a Major U.S.City
- Pelé, Brazilian soccer player.
- 1974: Pramukh Swami Maharaj, President and Spiritual head of BAPS
- June 16, 2011: Valerie Bertinelli, Jane Leeves, Wendie Malick, and Betty White, the stars of the television series Hot in Cleveland.
- November 5, 2011: Aretha Franklin, American singer.
- July 17, 2015: Mickey Bey, IBF lightweight boxing champion.

=== Dayton ===
- 2023: Dr. Derrick L. Foward, American Civil Rights Activist.
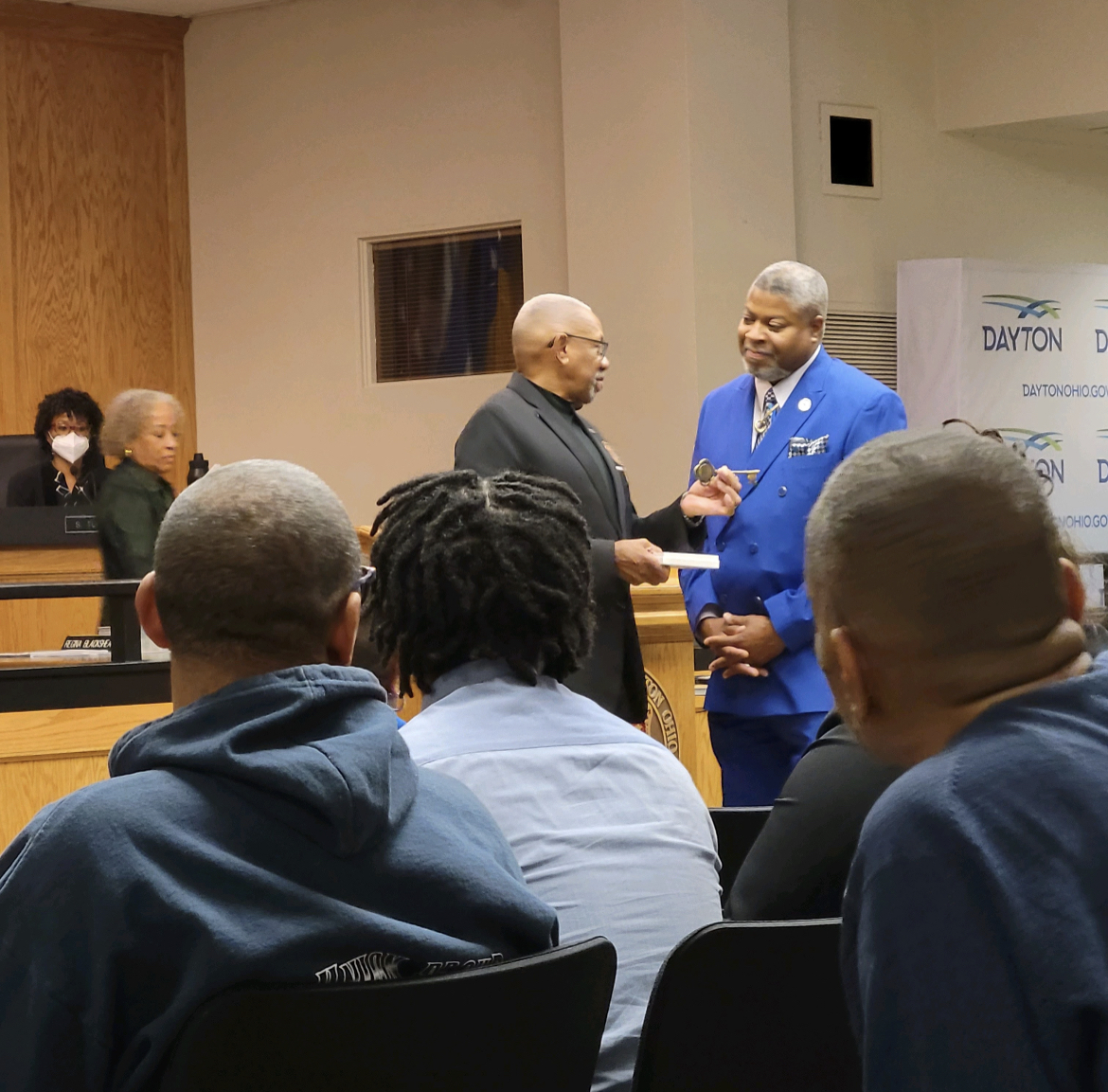
  Dayton Mayor Jeffery J. Mims, Jr. Presents Dayton NAACP President Dr Derrick L. Foward With a Key to the City on May 3, 2023
- 2023: Edwin C. Moses, Olympian.

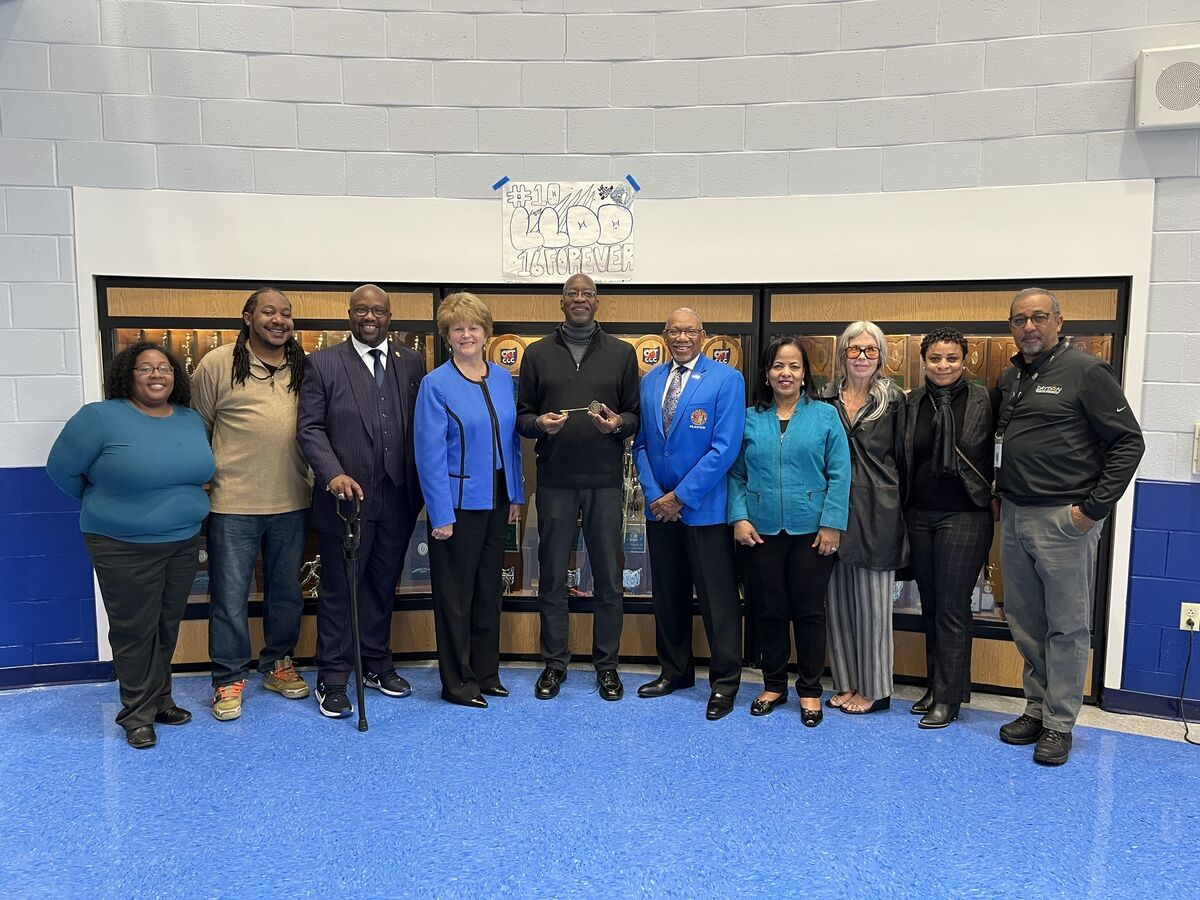
Dayton Mayor Jeffery J. Mims, Jr. Presents Olympian Edwin C. Moses a Key to the City of Dayton

- 2023: Mildred White Rogan, Teacher.
- 2023: Dr. Jill Biden, First Lady of the United States of America.
- 2021: Jeff Cooper, Public Health Official.
- 2021: Michael Dohn, Public Health Official.
- 2021: Terra Williams, Public Health Official.
- 2015: David McCullough, Author of "The Wright Brothers."
- 1964: Martin Luther King, Jr., American Baptist Minister and Civil Rights Activist.

=== Eastlake ===
- June 7, 2016: Former professional mixed martial arts fighter Stipe Miocic received the key to the city after winning the UFC Heavyweight Championship.

=== Warren ===
- August 2, 2009: Dave Grohl, American Musician.

== Oklahoma ==
=== Norman ===
- May 18, 1925: Independent Order of Odd Fellows received a key to the city from Mayor Guy Spottswood.

=== Oklahoma City ===
- June 13, 2022: Russell Westbrook, American basketball player, received a key to the city from Mayor David Holt.
- May 14, 2019: Kristin Chenoweth, American actress and singer.
- 2025: Katy Perry, American singer, songwriter, and television personality.

=== Tulsa ===
- March 18, 2010: Robert Meachem, NFL Football Player.
- June 27, 2017: Iesha-LaShay Phillips received a key to the city of Tulsa, OK for addressing societal issues and trying to better her city. Mayor Bynum also declared June 27 "Iesha Phillips Day" in Tulsa, Oklahoma.
- October 8, 2022: Employees of Saint Francis Health System collectively received a single key to the city for their services to the community.

== Pennsylvania ==
=== Philadelphia ===
- 1993: The Who
- December 15, 2022: Gillie Da King And Wallo
- January 11, 2024: Marcus Morris Sr., American basketball player and philanthropist.
- May 28, 2025: Quinta Brunson, actress and producer, whose show Abbott Elementary is based on the Philadelphia school she attended.

=== Pittsburgh ===
- September 20, 2013: mayor Luke Ravenstahl presented the Key to the City of Pittsburgh to rapper Mac Miller and received official city proclamation declaring September 20 Mac Miller Day.

=== Reading ===
- July 19, 2022: NBA basketball player Lonnie Walker IV was presented the Key to the City of Reading after hosting his annual basketball camp in his home town.

== Rhode Island ==
=== Central Falls ===
- June 7, 2014: Central Falls mayor James Diossa presented the Key to the city to actor Alec Baldwin in recognition of his financial support of the city's public library.

=== Pawtucket ===
- January 15, 2016: Rep. Carlos E. Tobon and Mayor Don Grebien presented recording artist Jon B. with a state citation and a key to the City of Pawtucket

=== Providence ===
- December 9, 1921: Italian commander Armando Diaz was presented with a "solid gold" Key to the city by mayor Joseph H. Gainer.
- (ca. 1980s): Mayor Joseph R. Paolino Jr. presented the Key to the city to Joe Mangone
- 1992: Mayor Buddy Cianci presented the Key to the city to telephone operator Rose P. Brock, for her work updating the City Hall computer systems.
- June 20, 2005: Mayor David Cicilline presented the Key to the city to Mark J. Lerman, artistic director of Providence's Perishable Theatre
- April 21, 2021: Mayor Jorge Elorza presented the Key to the city to NCAA official Michael Stephens "following his illustrious selection as an official in the NCAA Men's Basketball Division I championship game"
- May 17, 2022: Mayor Jorge Elorza presented the Key to the city to Providence College Men's Basketball Head Coach Ed Cooley
- November 30, 2022: Mayor Elorza presented World Series MVP Jeremy Peña with the Key to the City

=== Woonsocket ===
- May 12, 2017: Mayor Lisa Baldelli-Hunt presented MMA athlete Andre Soukhamthath with the Key to the City of Woonsocket.

== South Carolina ==
=== Columbia ===
- November 9, 1973: Muhammad Ali then NABF Heavyweight Champion received the key to the City of Columbia from then Mayor John T Campbell in Ali's next two bouts he would go on to beat Joe Frazier & George Foreman.
- August 21, 2018: Beyoncé and Jay-Z received the key to the city of Columbia, SC for their philanthropy work and impact on popular culture. Mayor Steve Benjamin also declared August 21 "Beyoncé Knowles-Carter and Sean Carter Day" in the city.
- February 5, 2019: Angell Conwell, television actress and native of nearby Orangeburg.
- November 13, 2023: A'ja Wilson, WNBA forward

== Tennessee ==
=== Dayton ===
- July 21, 1960: John T. Scopes was given the key to the city on the 35th anniversary of the Scopes Trial, in which he had been found guilty of teaching evolution in a Tennessee school.

=== Elizabethton ===
- June 21, 2013: Jason Witten, American football player

=== Knoxville ===
- September 17, 2021: Bianca Belair was handed the key to the city by Mayor Glenn Thomas Jacobs during her homecoming ceremony on WWE Smackdown.

=== Memphis ===
- February 15, 2011: Grandmaster Hikaru Nakamura received the key to the city of Memphis for his supertournament victory at the 2011 Tata Steel Chess Tournament in Wijk aan Zee.
- June 27, 2023: Drake received the key to Memphis in recognition of his frequent references to Memphis in his songs.

=== Nashville ===
- 1967: Daniel Sharpe Malekebu, Malawian doctor, missionary, and anti-colonial activist.
- 1984: John Glenn, American Astronaut and United States Senator.
- 1991: Jean Stafford, Australian country music artist.

=== Oak Ridge ===
- July 2016: Katsumi Watanabe and Shinchiro Ito
- June 29, 2022: Louise "Tiddle" Thomas

== Texas ==
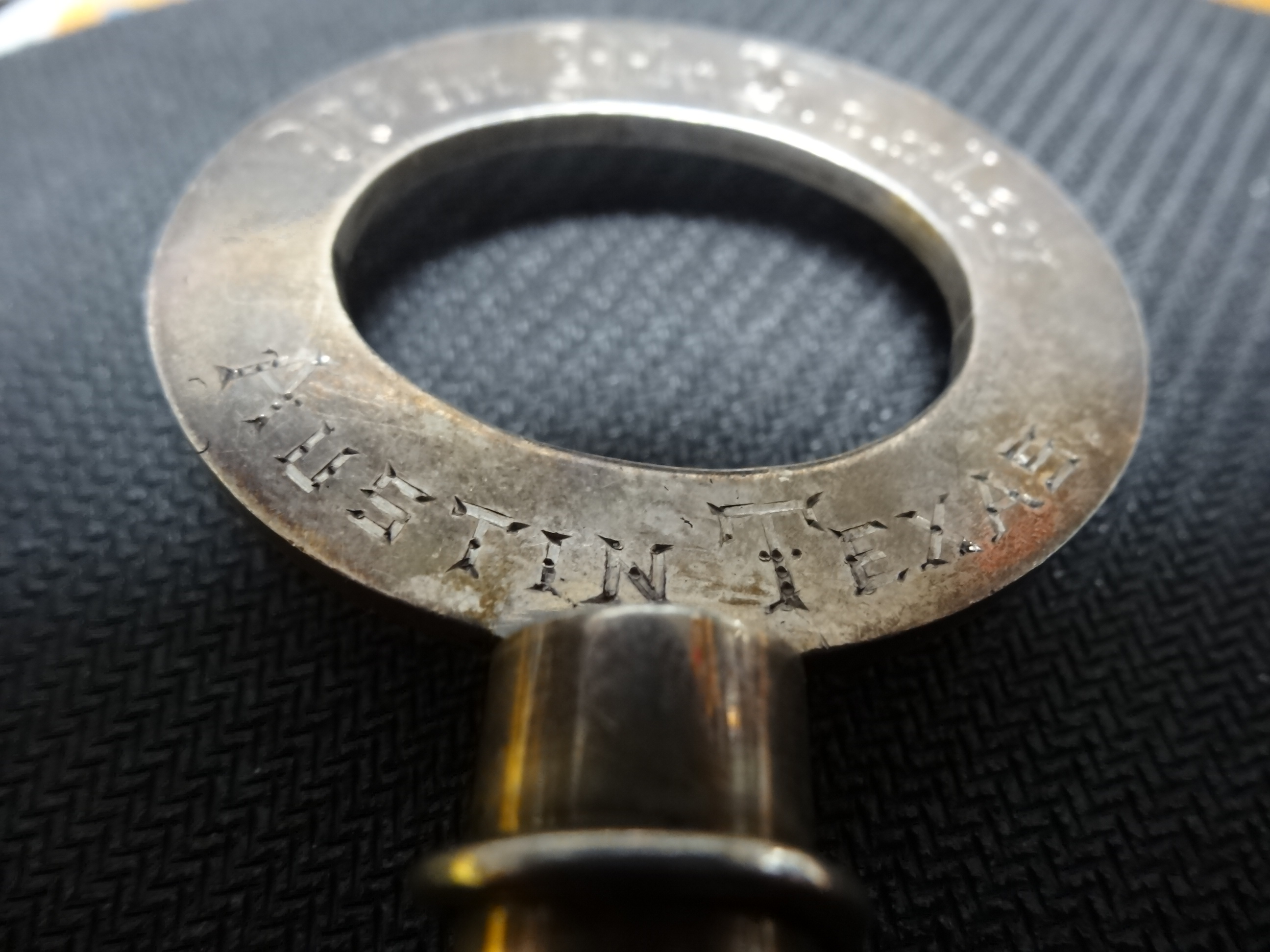
President McKinley Key to the City

=== Arlington ===
- March 30, 2023: Singer-songwriter Taylor Swift was presented with the key to Arlington in honor of The Eras Tour.

=== Austin ===
- May 3, 1901: President William McKinley received the key to Austin, Texas from Mayor R.F White.
- April 11, 2008: His Highness the Aga Khan, Imam (spiritual leader) of the Ismaili Muslims and founder of the Aga Khan Development Network (AKDN) was presented with the Key to the City of Austin by Mayor Will Wynn of Austin upon his arrival in the city.

=== Beaumont ===
- November 17, 2005: Johnny and Edgar Winter were inducted to the Southeast Texas Walk of fame at Ford Park in their hometown of Beaumont, Texas for their contribution to music and career accomplishments. They were awarded the key to the city by the Mayor and County Judge.
- June 4, 2015: Mayor Becky Ames awarded Beaumont native Layla Nejad the key to the city - alongside her Texas 4000 for Cancer team after cycling to City Hall during a stop on the 70-day charity cycling trip from Austin, Tx to Anchorage, AK - for her role in helping expand the route to stop in Southeast Texas to raise money and awareness for cancer research.

=== Dallas ===
- December 13, 2009: M. K. Asante was awarded the key to the city of Dallas for his work as an author, filmmaker, and professor.
- February 6, 2011: Michael Vick, quarterback for the Philadelphia Eagles, was awarded the key to the city of Dallas by Mayor Pro Tem Dwaine Caraway; this proved controversial, as Vick had previously served time in prison for his involvement with an illegal dog-fighting ring.
- November 21, 2018: Dirk Nowitzki, basketball player for the Dallas Mavericks, was awarded the key to the city of Dallas by Mayor Mike Rawlings for his professional achievements in his 20 seasons with the organization, as well as his humanitarian contributions.

=== Denison ===
- 1952: Presidential candidate General Dwight D. Eisenhower received the key to his birthplace city from Mayor Alfred Cecil "Mike" Casey.

=== El Paso ===
- February 10, 2012: Gabriel Iglesias was presented with several awards by the city of El Paso, Texas, including the key to the city and the Beacon of H.O.P.E Award from the nonprofit organization Operation H.O.P.E.
- September 13, 2018: Recording R&B artist and El Pasoan Khalid earned the key to El Paso, Texas from Mayor Donald "Dee" Margo.

June 13, 2025 Cold Play receives key to the city on Friday night concert.

=== Fort Worth ===
- November 9, 2023: The Texas Rangers were awarded the key to the city at Billy Bob's Texas by Mayor Mattie Parker to commemorate their winning of the 2023 World Series.

=== Houston ===
- September 22, 2019: The Texas India Forum hosted Howdy Modi, a community event in honour of the Prime Minister of India Narendra Modi at NRG Stadium in Houston, Texas. The event was attended by over 50,000 people and several American politicians, including President Donald Trump, making it the largest gathering for an invited foreign leader visiting the United States other than the Pope. At the event, Modi was presented with the Key to the City of Houston by Mayor Sylvester Turner.
- May 1, 2022: Mayor Sylvester Turner presented rapper Megan Thee Stallion with a key to the city of Houston which is her hometown.

=== Irving ===
- July 19, 2013: Mike and Bob Bryan, twin brothers and professional tennis players
- August 20, 2017: Mahant Swami Maharaj, Hindu swami and 6th Spiritual leader of BAPS.

=== La Grange ===
- October 3, 2026: Oktoberfest visitors from Prosper, New Braunfels & Houston were presented with the Key to the City of La Grange by Mayor Dockery. The group of friends have returned annually for 6 consecutive years to celebrate Oktoberfest while wearing traditional German lederhosen.

=== Mansfield ===
- June 6, 2013: Tony Kanaan, race car driver

=== Missouri City, TX ===
- March 2, 2015 Johnnie Moutra III (Johnny Long), nationally known for co-hosting Jimmy Kimmel Live at his home & winning the grand prize on ABC's hit reality TV show "Here Come The Newlyweds," was awarded key to the city by Mayor Allen Owen for the national recognition he continues to bring to the city.
- February 10, 2018: Missouri City native rapper Travis Scott was awarded the key by Mayor Allen Owen as a part of the city's annual Black History Month Celebration of Culture and Music.

=== North Richland Hills ===
- February 11, 2023: Gabriel Cespedes, detective

=== Plano ===
- May 28, 2026: Figure skater Amber Glenn was presented with the key to Plano in honor of her accomplishments at the 2026 Winter Olympics.

=== Sugar Land ===
- March 18, 2018: His Highness the Aga Khan, Imam (spiritual leader) of the Ismaili Muslims and founder of the Aga Khan Development Network (AKDN), was presented with a Key to the City of Sugar Land by Mayor Zimmerman in recognition of his 60 years of commitment to improving the quality of life for some of the world's most vulnerable populations.

== Utah ==
=== West Valley City ===
- July 27, 2011: Halaevalu Mata'aho 'Ahome'e, HM The Queen Mother of Tonga
- December 13, 2011: Guns N' Roses was given the key to the city by then mayor-Mike Winder

=== Ogden ===
- June 15, 2013: Damian Lillard, basketball player

=== Kaysville City ===
- May 31, 2017: Lincoln and Dan Markham, YouTube stars

=== City of Moab ===
- September 17, 2022: Kevin Costner was given the key to the city by Mayor Joette Langianese

== Virginia ==
=== Roanoke ===
- May 4, 2016: George Takei was given the Key to the city by Mayor David A. Bowers

== Washington ==
=== Seattle ===
- 1968: Seattle officials planned to give musician Jimi Hendrix the keys to the city, but canceled the event.
- In 1984, Seattle mayor Charles Royer stated that the city does not award keys, but instead gifted comedian Bob Hope a quiche with the design of the Space Needle.

=== Bremerton ===
- September 2006: MxPx was given the keys to the city of Bremerton by Mayor Cary Bozeman.

=== Kent ===
- August 2020: YouTuber Justin "nothinbutlag" was given the keys to the city of Kent by Mayor Dana Ralph for helping the city increase their social media following.

=== Spokane ===
- June 9, 1948: Harry S. Truman, 33rd President of the United States, stopped at Spokane while campaigning for re-election, and was given the key to the city.
- 1980: Ted Nugent, Rock musician, stopped in Spokane during a concert tour, and was given the key to the city by then-mayor Ron Bair.

== Wisconsin ==
=== Green Bay ===
- January 4, 2004: Arizona Cardinals receiver Nate Poole was presented the key to the city from Mayor Jim Schmitt for catching a late touchdown pass against the Green Bay Packers' hated rival, the Minnesota Vikings, in the final game of the regular season, which allowed the Packers to make the playoffs that season. After the presentation, Poole was invited to attend the Packers' playoff game against the Seattle Seahawks.
- August 10, 2016: Rock band Kiss played at the Resch Center on the Freedom to Rock Tour. During the encore, they were presented the key to the city by Mayor Jim Schmitt.

=== Wausau ===
- July 2007: Musician "Weird Al" Yankovic received the key to the city after a concert performance at the Wisconsin Valley Fair.
