= Scarlett's Magic =

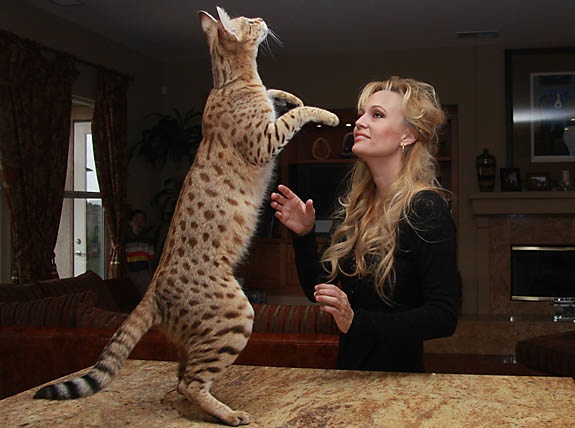
- Scarlett's Magic stands tall with owner Kimberly Draper
- Species: Cat × serval F1 hybrid
- Breed: Savannah cat
- Sex: Female
- Born: 6 March 2008 (age 18)
- Nationality: United States
- Title: World's Tallest Cat
- Successor: Arcturus Aldebaran Powers
- Owner: Draper-family
- Awards: Guinness World Records

Scarlett's Magic (born 6 March 2008) is a black spotted tabby F1 Savannah cat from the US, acclaimed by the Guinness World Records as the former world's tallest living domestic cat. The record has since been broken by Arcturus Aldebaran Powers who stands 48.5 cm (19.1 in) tall.

== Biography ==
Scarlett's Magic is a Savannah F1 hybrid cat, born on 6 March 2008. She is owned by and lives with the Draper-family as their pet. Her sweet temperament and unusual appearance make her a celebrity at local schools, libraries, and retirement homes in Southern California, US.

== Recognition ==
She first achieved a Guinness World Record in 2009 when she measured 41.87 cm (16.48 in) from shoulder to toe. One year later, she broke her own record by growing over one additional inch, measuring 45.9 cm (18.07 in) from shoulder to toe. Her international achievement can be seen on page 155 in the 2011 Guinness Book.

In 2010, Scarlett's Magic was also awarded a second Guinness World Record for longest, living, domestic cat (feline) at 108.51 cm (42.72 in) in length and is the first animal to simultaneously hold two Guinness World Records.

On 12 March 2010, Scarlett's Magic was awarded the "Key to the City" of Corona, California, US, for her role in the local community and recognition by the Guinness World Records. She has also made several national television appearances including on Live with Regis and Kelly and Animal Planet.

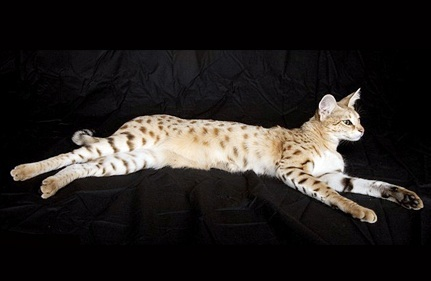
Laying

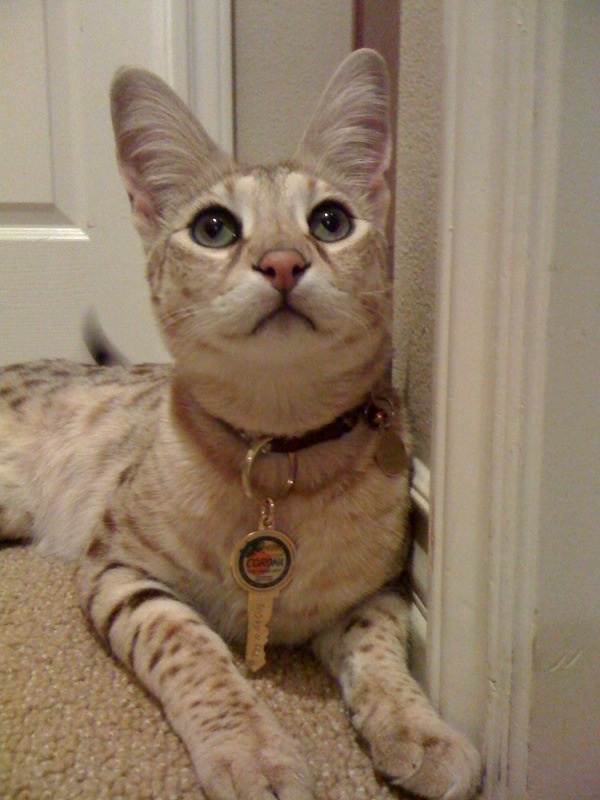
Wearing Her "Key to the City"

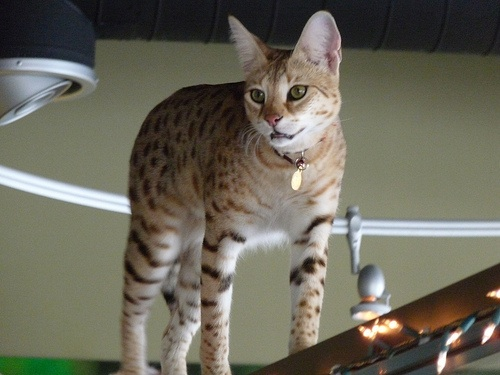
Roaming

== See also ==
- List of individual cats
