= Self-propelled barge T-36 =

Soviet barge

Drift of Self-propelled barge T-36
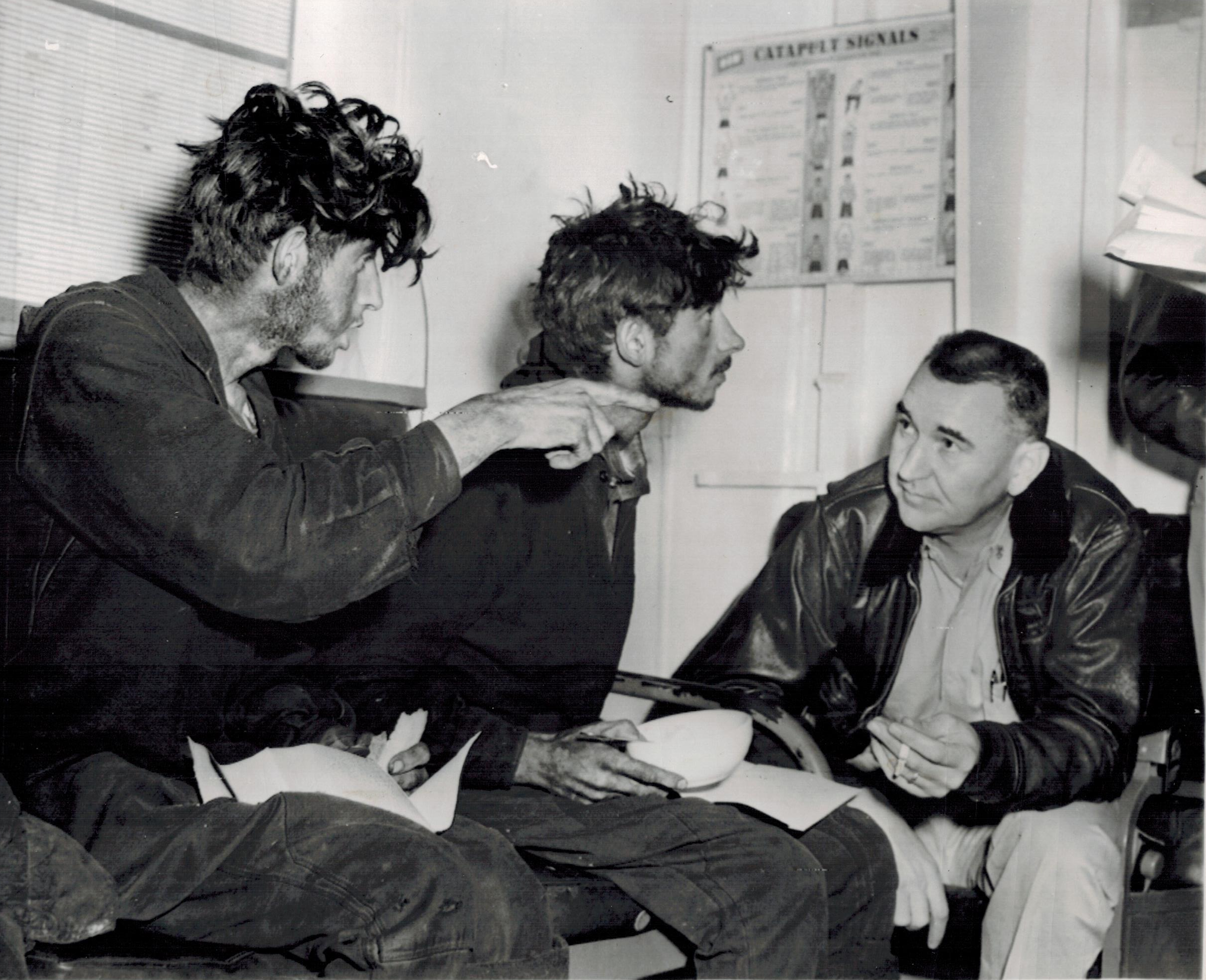
- Philip Poplavsky (left) and Askhat Ziganshin (center)

- Date: January 17, 1960
- Duration: 49 days
- Injuries: 4

T-36 landing craft

The self-propelled barge T-36 was a Soviet barge of the Project 306 type. The barge is known for drifting 49 days across the North Pacific Ocean in 1960 after being disabled, with all sailors on board surviving the journey by rationing three days' supply of food.

== Background ==
External images
- Self-propelled barge «Т-42» of the same model (Т-4)
- Soviet self-propelled barges moored in the harbor of Iturup island (1960s)

The Soviet military maintained a garrison on the island of Iturup in the Kuril Islands. In December 1959, all six of the self-propelled barges attached to the garrison were beached to wait out the period of winter storms and to perform planned repairs. Ten-day emergency rations that were normally stored aboard were removed and sent to the depot.

Shortly before January 17, 1960, the command was alerted of a final supply ship's late arrival. Two of the six barges, T-36 and T-97, were dragged back to the water. Each barge received 1.5 tonnes of diesel fuel and, on January 15, a three-day supply of water and food. They were moored to a floating barrel approximately 500 feet offshore.

The T-36 had a waterline length of 17.3 m. Its width was 3.6 m, its depth 2 m, its draft 1.2 m. It had two engines, speed of 9 knots, and tonnage of 100 tons. The crew consisted of 21-year-old Tatar Junior Sergeant Askhat Ziganshin, 22-year-old Russian Private Ivan Fedotov, and two 20-year-old Ukrainians: Private Philip Poplavsky and Private Anatoly Kryuchkovsky.

== Storm ==
Shortly after midnight on January 17, 1960, the barges were hit by a severe storm, accompanied with hurricane-force winds. The tackle was torn, and the crew started the barge's engines in an attempt to stay away from the rocks. Weighing anchor away from the shore proved impossible due to poor visibility and strong winds. After 40 to 50 minutes the wind pushed the barge too close to the shore, so the engines were started again in order to navigate further away from it. This sequence repeated a few more times. The sailors continued fighting with the storm for over 10 hours.

Eventually the eye of the storm passed over the island and the wind reversed direction, now pushing the barge away from the shore. The crew decided to beach the barge, but when they attempted to do so, around 10 p.m., the engines ran out of fuel and stopped. The wind dragged the barge out of the lagoon and into the open ocean. The crew of T-97 had better luck and managed to successfully beach their vessel.

The garrison command was aware of the crew's struggle with the hurricane, but then radio communications ceased, as the barge's transmitter was rendered inoperable by the storm. As the storm subsided, a search and rescue crew of 15 soldiers was deployed to sweep the seashore. The wreckage discovered by them, including a lifebuoy and remnants of the wooden coal storage box which were both marked with the barge's number, confirmed the suspicion that the barge had been sunk by the hurricane, and its crew perished. After the conclusion of search efforts, formal missing person notifications were sent to the families of the crew.

== Drift ==
Ziganshin recorded the details into the vessel's deck log. From a recent newspaper found aboard, the crew learned that the area of the ocean the vessel was drifting towards (according to their personal estimate, which was later found to be incorrect) was being officially dedicated for ballistic missile testing for the period between January 15 and February 15. With that in mind, Ziganshin estimated that the chances of their rescue in the near future were extremely slim, and decided to strictly ration the available food and water. Nonetheless the crew manned the helm around the clock, "just in case".

On the second day at sea, the crew took stock of their situation. The available supplies consisted of approximately two buckets of potatoes, a loaf of bread, three pounds of lard, a can and a half of canned meat, some fresh water in the teakettle (the 2-bucket-worth tank of fresh water was destroyed by the storm), a couple pounds of millet and dried peas, one carton of tea and one of coffee, and approximately fifty matches. The buckets of potatoes that were stored in the engine room were turned over by the storm, and the potatoes scattered over the floor and became sodden in diesel fuel. A significant amount, 120 litres (32 US gal), of fresh water, "red with rust, tasting like metal", was sourced from the engines' cooling system. In order to preserve this supply, the crew, when possible, spread their bedsheets on the deck, allowing them to soak in rainwater, and then wrung the water out of them.

In order to keep themselves warm, the soldiers tended a fire in the potbelly stove, utilizing available combustible materials such as wooden crates, lifesavers, rags, paper scraps, old newspapers, and wooden planks from two of their beds. Once these easily available materials were exhausted, the crew eventually resorted to burning tires that served as the barge's fenders, filing pieces of rubber off them with a dull kitchen knife; each tire lasted about a week. After exhausting the available food supplies, the crew eventually ate their leather belts, wristlets, leather parts of their garmon and leather parts of their boots in attempts to quell the hunger.

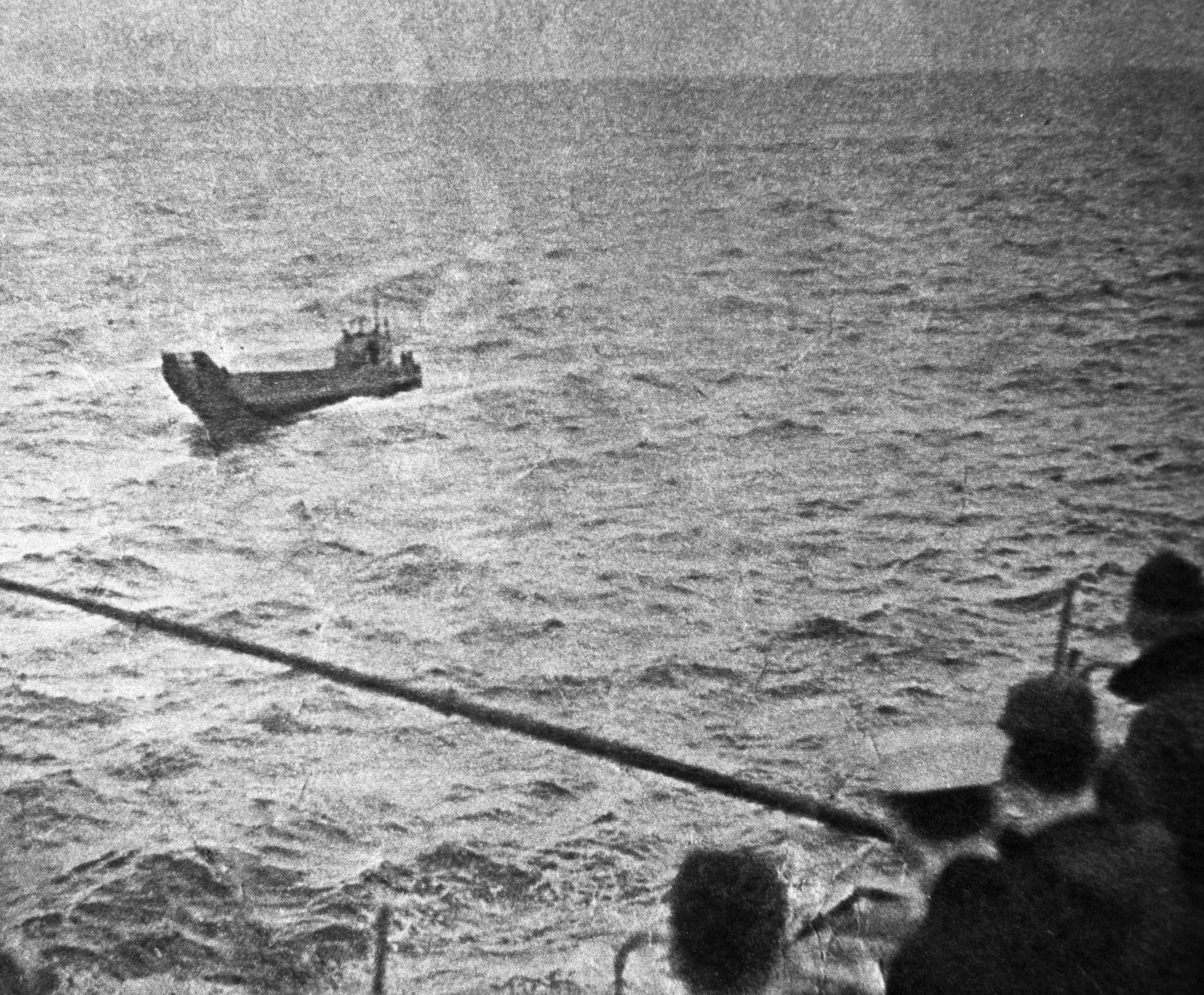
T-36 as seen from USS Kearsarge

Approximately 40 days into their journey the men spotted a passing ship, but attempts to attract its attention failed; in the following days, two more ships passed by without noticing them. Finally, around 3 p.m. (local time) on March 7, after drifting for 49 days, they were spotted by two Grumman S-2 Trackers launched by USS Kearsarge in stormy waters 1,200 miles (1,900 km) off Wake Island, and subsequently rescued.

== Aftermath ==
External videos
- USS Kearsarge Rescues Soviet Sailors Adrift for 49 Days. on YouTube
- Four Russian Heroes Return Home After Being Adrift In Pacific Ocean. on YouTube

The drift of the crew was noticed by the worldwide press. Returning to the Soviet Union, the crew had popularity close to that of cosmonauts, and took a major role in Soviet popular culture. The Soviet government expressed gratitude to the Kearsarge for its gesture. The crew was soon returned home, first traveling to Paris on RMS Queen Mary and then flying to the USSR, as doctors recommended against taking a transatlantic flight.

== Gallery ==
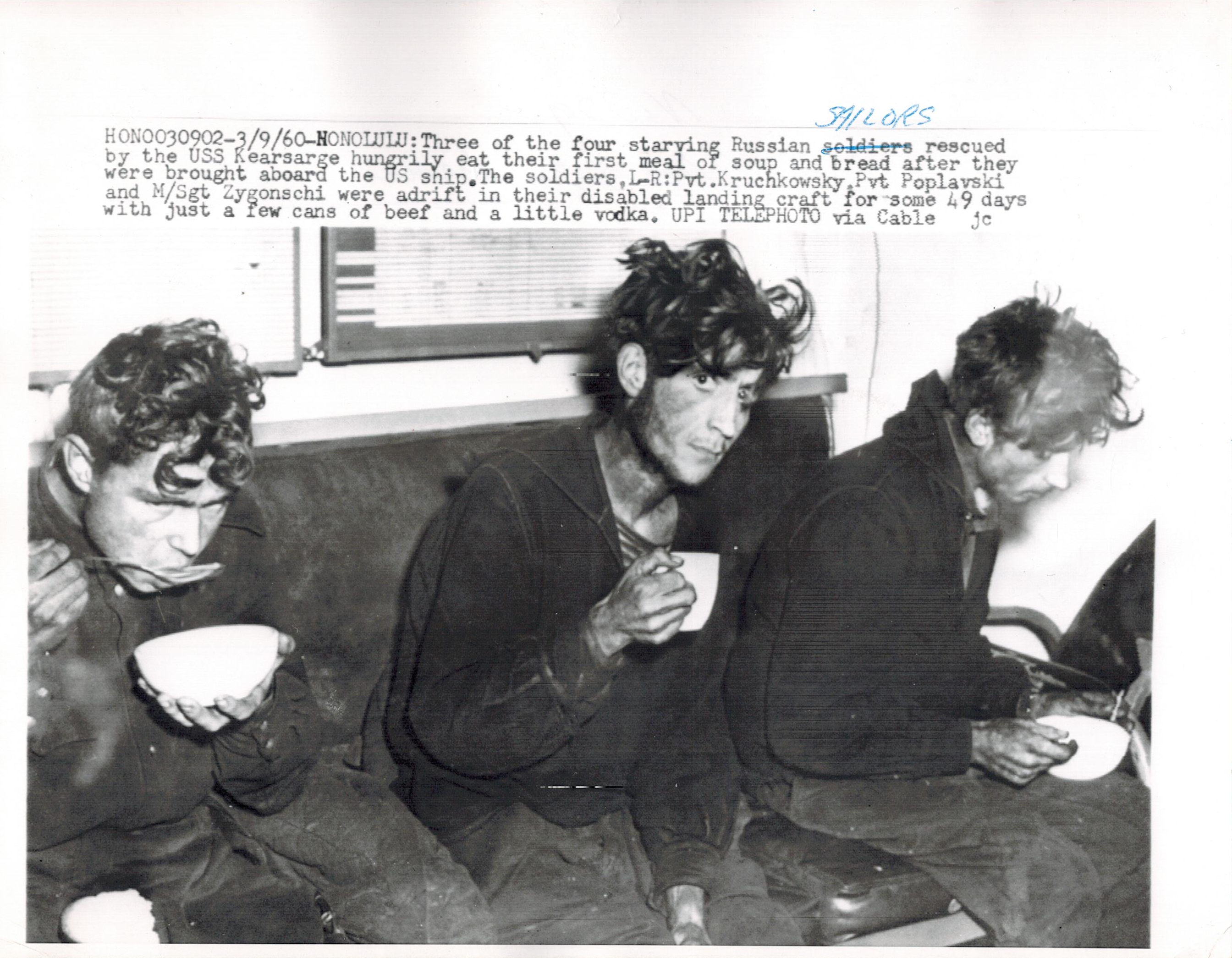
Kryuchkovsky, Poplavsky, Ziganshin consuming some soup and bread shortly after being rescued.

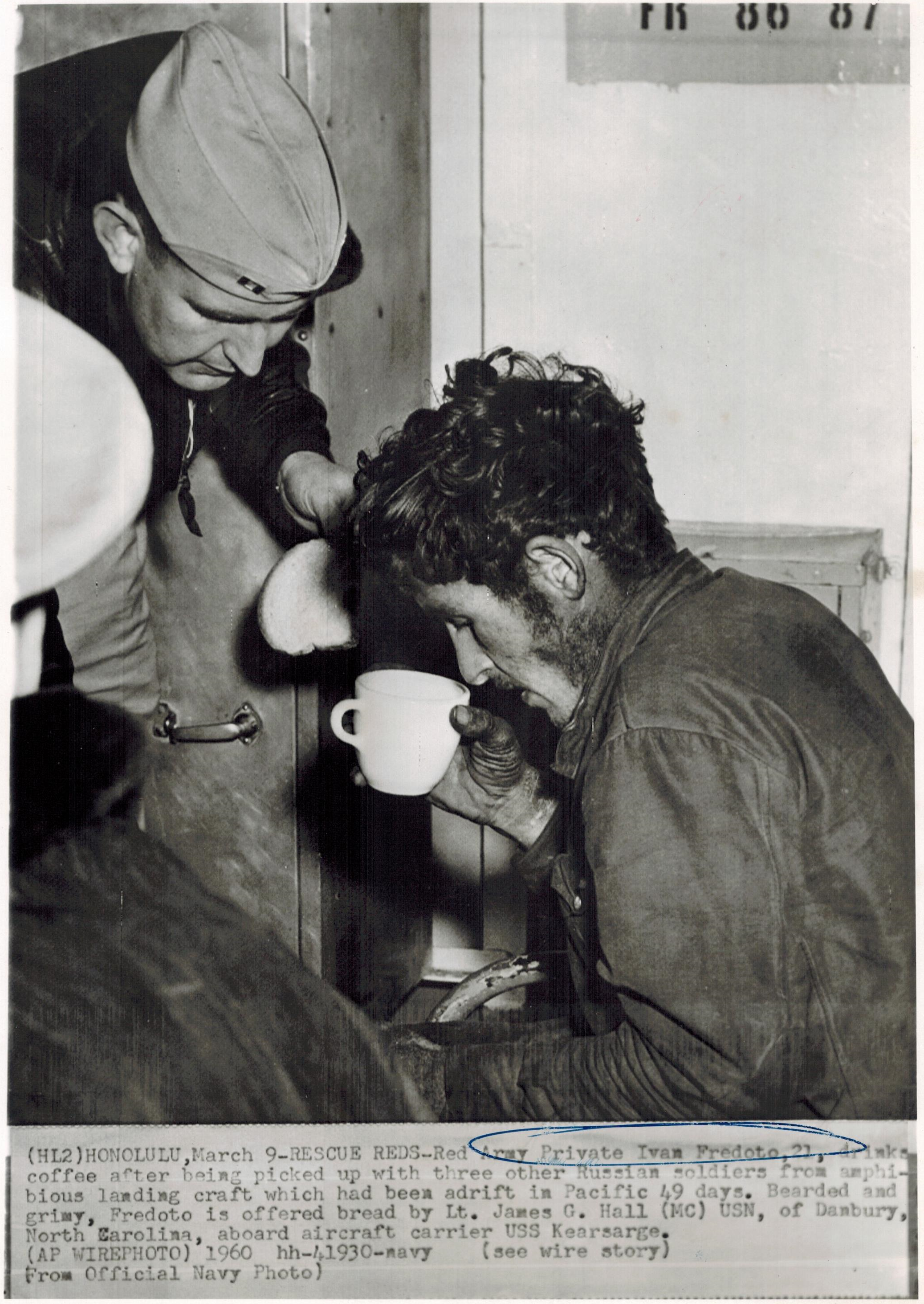
Ivan Fedotov drinking coffee after being rescued. March 9, 1960.

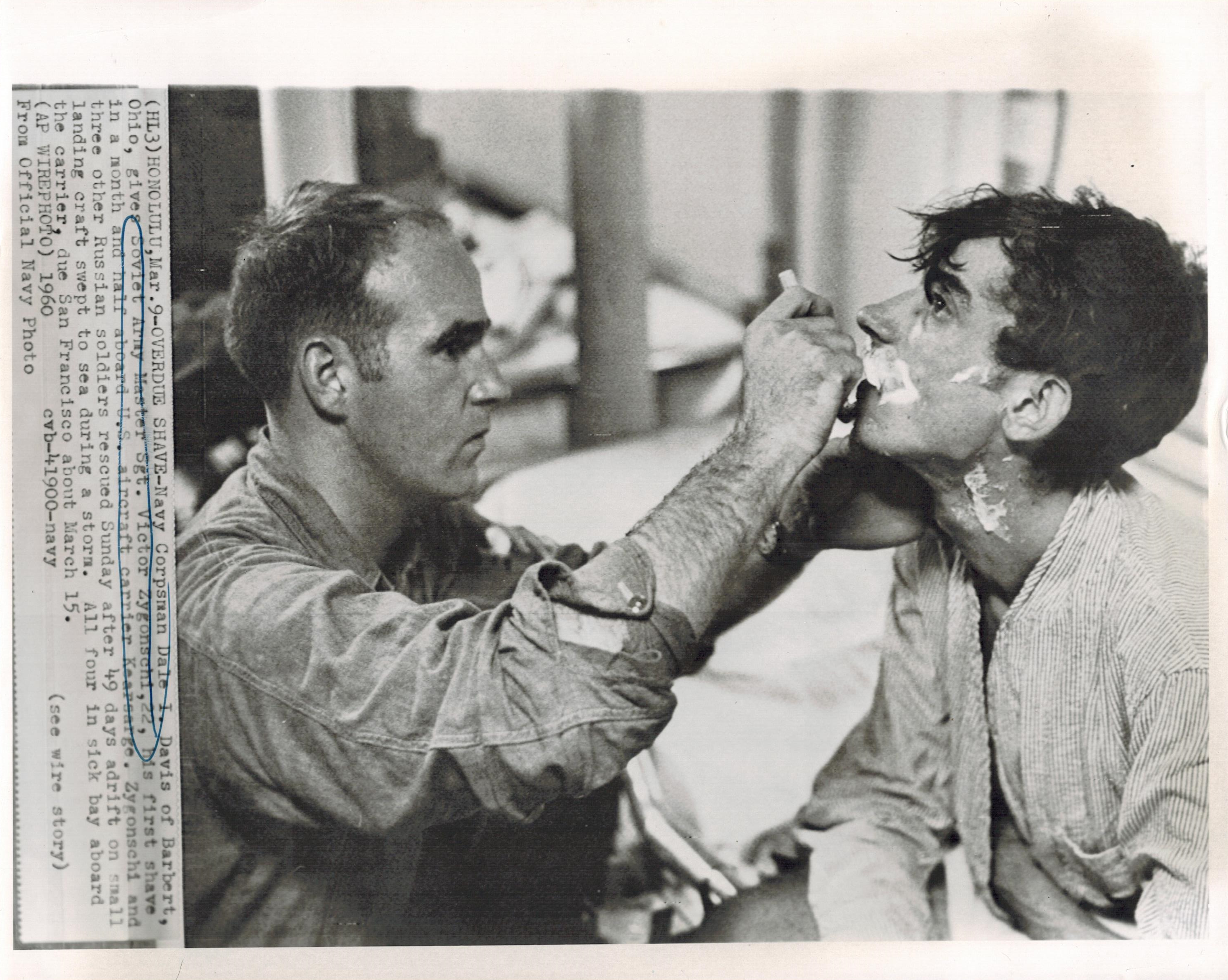
Askhat Ziganshin is being shaved for the first time in 49 days.

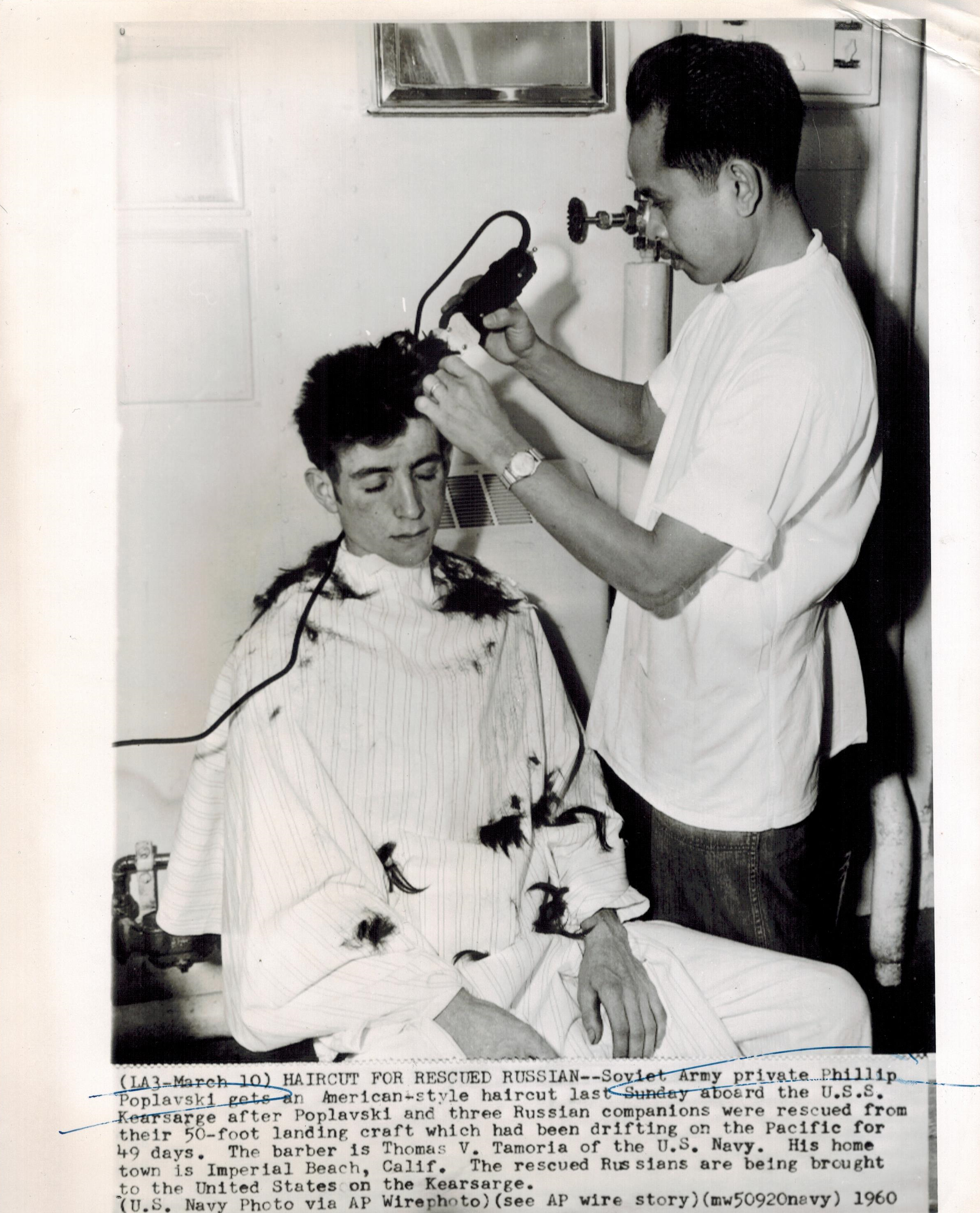
Filipp Poplavsky getting a haircut for the first time in 49 days.

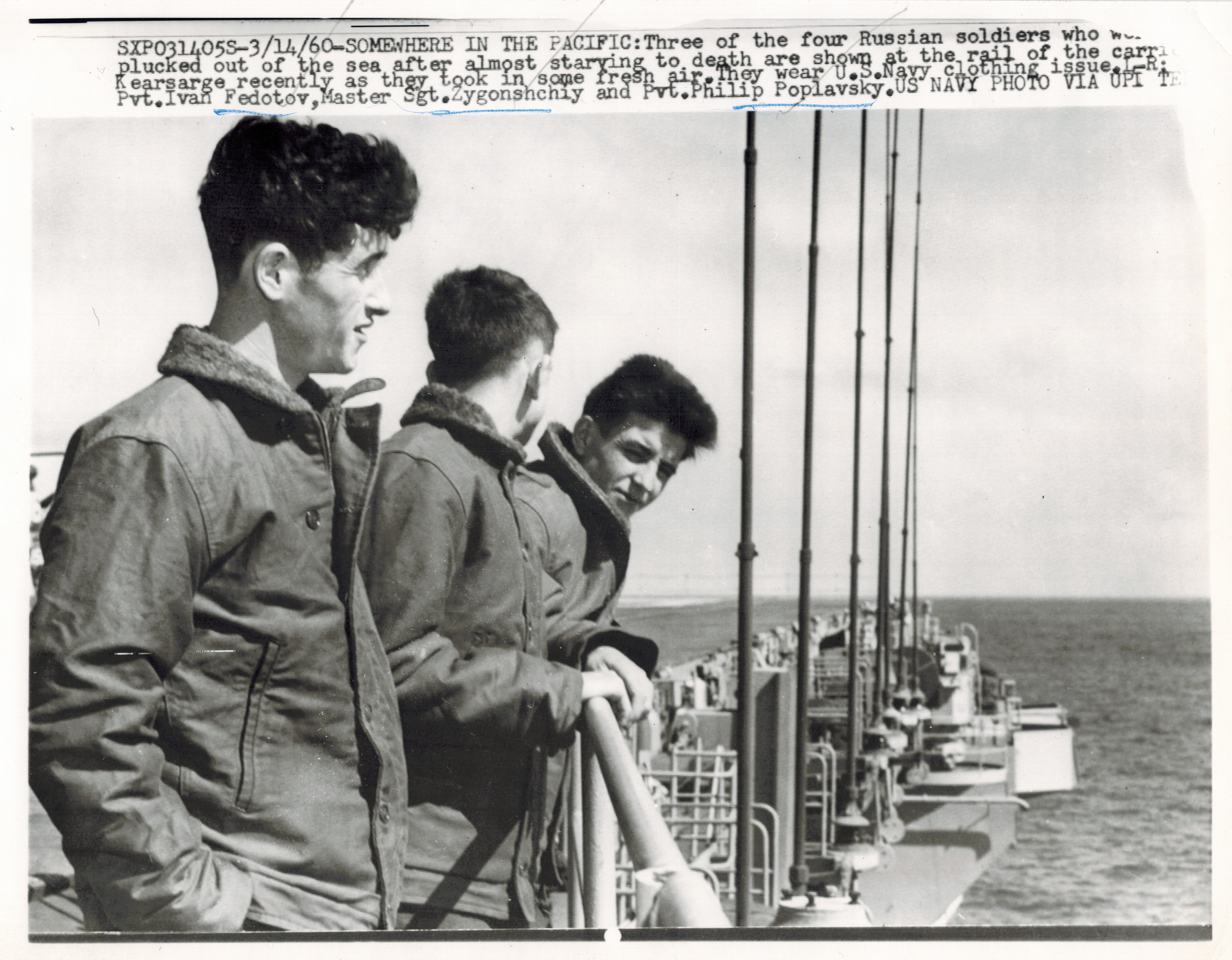
Fedotov, Ziganshin, Poplavsky on the deck of USS Kearsarge. March 14, 1960

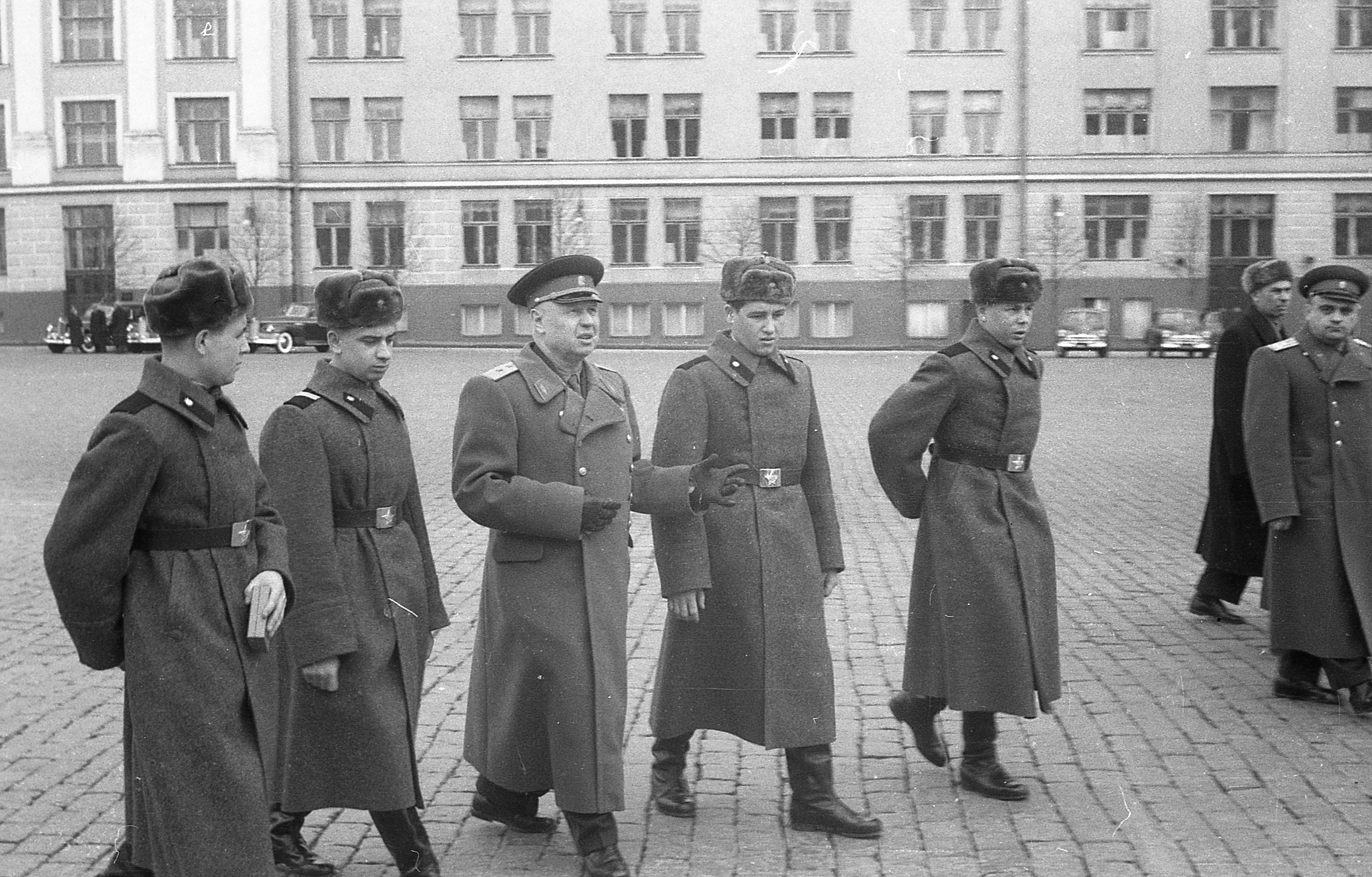
Left to right: Fedotov, Ziganshin, gen. Filipp Golikov, Poplavsky, Kryuchkovsky near Kremlin. Late March 1960.
