= Awadeya Mahmoud =

Sudanese businesswoman

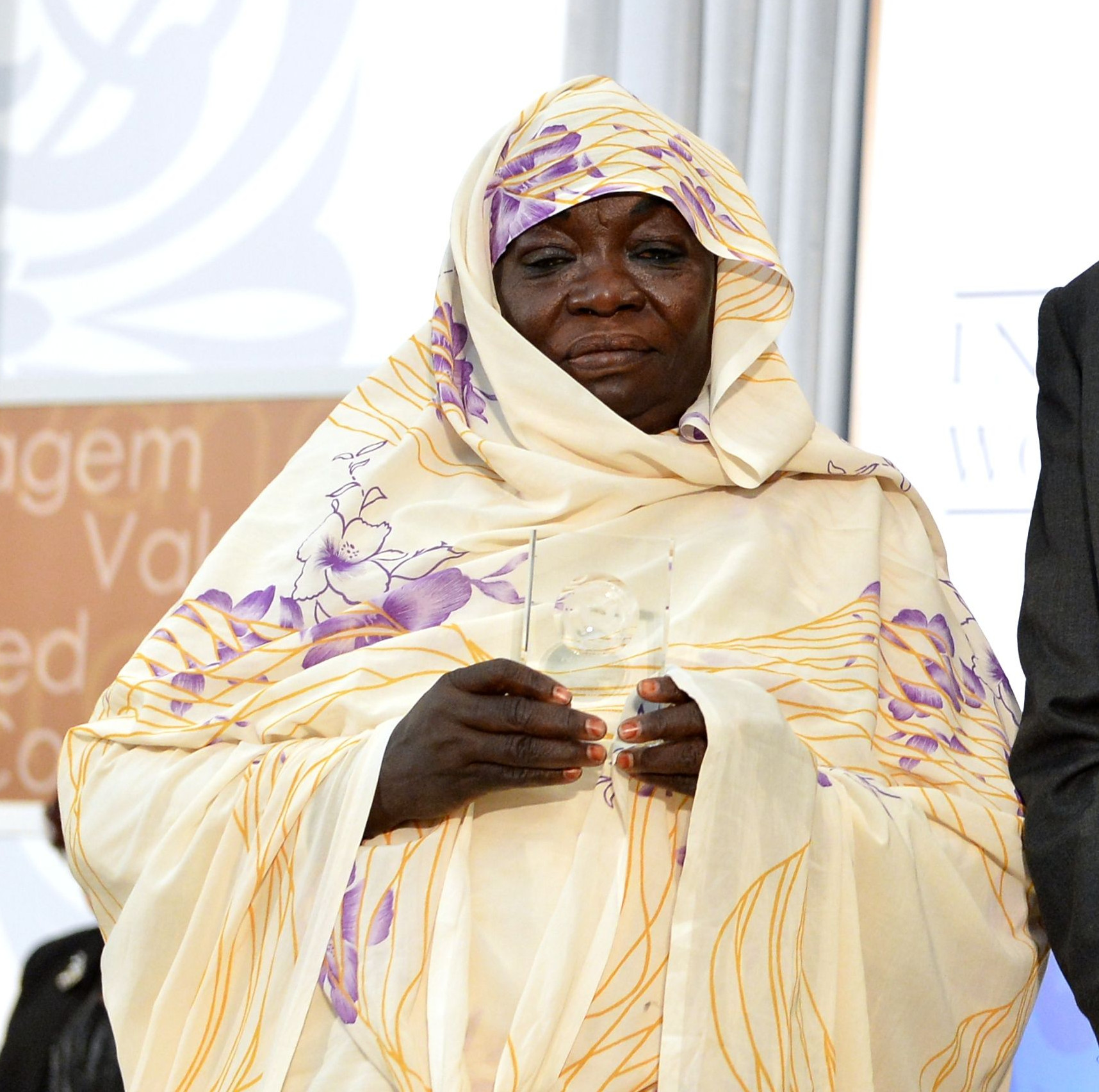
- Mahmoud at the award ceremony for her Women of Courage award
- Born: 1963 (age 62–63); South Kordofan region
- Citizenship: Sudan
- Occupation: Businesswoman
- Organization: The Women's Multi-Purpose Cooperative for Khartoum
- Awards: International Women of Courage Award

Awadeya Mahmoud (Arabic: عوضية محمود) is a Sudanese woman, who is the founder and chairwoman of the Women's Food and Tea Sellers' Cooperative and the Women's Multi-Purpose Cooperative for Khartoum state, Sudan. On 28 March 2016, the United States Department of State announced her as one of the recipients of the International Women of Courage Award for that year.

== Life ==
Awadeya Mahmoud was born in 1963 in Sudan, South Kordofan region and after conflict her family moved to Khartoum. She married and in 1986 she began selling tea to make living. This was a lowly occupation but she needed to support her family. In 1990 she began a co-operative which offered legal aid and support to its members. It was called the Women's Food and Tea Sellers' Cooperative and the Women's Multi-Purpose Cooperative.

Through the cooperative office a legal means could now be funded to combat the authorities when they confiscated the equipment of members(mostly women) for selling tea and food on street. It did not all go well and she had to serve four years in jail after she and others were in debt after a poor investment. After her release she continued to support women and the cooperative had 8,000 members in Khartoum. The organization came to represent women displaced by the conflict in Darfur and the Two Areas.

== Honors ==
On 28 March 2016, the United States Department of State announced her as one of fourteen recipients of the International Women of Courage Award for that year. She was reported to be straight back at her job after receiving her award although she intended to extend her work outside Khartoum.
