= Microwave Dave =

American blues musician (1946–2026)

- Also known as: Microwave Dave
- Born: Dave Gallaher; April 25, 1946; Chicago, Illinois
- Died: February 6, 2026 (aged 79) Huntsville, Alabama
- Genres: Blues; Blues rock; R&B
- Formerly of: The Majestics; Cameron; Microwave Dave & The Nukes

Dave Gallaher (24 April 1946 - 6 February 2026), best known by his stage name Microwave Dave, was an American blues musician associated with Huntsville, Alabama.

== Biography ==
Dave Gallaher was born in Chicago. He was raised in Amarillo, Dallas, and Houston, Texas. The first instrument that he learned to play was the ukulele. He also played the trumpet, French horn, and drums in his high school band. He also played the drums at the Houston Oilers home games during the team's 1960 inaugural season in the American Football League.

In the 1960s, Gallaher played in an R&B Atlanta-based band called The Majestics. They once shared a bill with Aretha Franklin at a venue called The Royal Peacock.

Gallaher served as a United States Air Force intelligence specialist from 1967 to 1968, during the Vietnam War. While off duty, he played in a band called "The Rotations". The band got its name because its members were frequently rotated home, resulting an ever-changing lineup. The band was managed by a stripper from Saigon who went by the name Geri Vay.

After returning from Vietnam, Gallaher lived in Boston, Massachusetts, where he studied guitar at the Berklee College of Music. In Boston, he played in a rock band called "Cameron Company. The band later changed its name to Cameron, and re-located to Florida.

In the mid-1970s, while playing at a place called "Papa Joe's", he was introduced to The Allman Brothers Band's guitarist and singer Dickey Betts. Impressed with their performance, Betts gave the members of Cameron to the next night's Allman Brothers show and convinced the owner of Papa Joe's to let Cameron open their next night's show later than usual. After watching the Charlie Daniels Band's opening act and part of the Allman Brother's set, Galaher and the rest of the members of Cameron returned to Papa Joe's for their own show. While performing, Dickey Betts, Duane Allman, and Chuck Leavell showed up at Papa Joe's. The ended up performing on stage with Gallaher and the other members of Cameron.

Dave Gallaher got his nickname "Microwave Dave" at the Kaffeeklatsch Bar in Huntsville, Alabama. One night in the mid-80s, Gallaher attended the bar to hear the harmonica player "Chicago" Bob Nelson perform. Nelson asked Gallaher to sit in and perform with him. After the performance, Nelson thanked Gallaher, and forgetting his last name, introduced him as "Dave the Microwave". The Kaffeeklatsch continued to be a central figure in Gallaher's career. Gallaher first began playing with this band "Microwave Dave and the Nukes" at the Kaffeeklatsch in 1989. He also played 22 consecutive Thanksgiving shows at the Kaffeeklatsch from 1992 until it closed down in 2015. The Kaffeeklatsch is where Gallaher began his solo act in 1992, and also where he recorded his first solo album, American Peasant, 2004.

On June 28, 2015, he was given the key to the city of Huntsville by Mayor Tommy Battle.

He died at age 79 on February 6, 2026. He had been scheduled to perform at The Nook in Huntsville, Alabama, but canceled it because of illness. His funeral was held at the Episcopal Church of the Nativity in Huntsville, Alabama on February 28.

== Legacy ==
On May 15, 2026, the City of Huntsville renamed a city street and dog park after Microwave Dave to honor his legacy and impact on the city's culture. Cleveland Avenue (between Meridian Street and Church Street) to Microwave Dave Way, and the Downtown Dog Spot was renamed the Microwave Dave Dog Spot. New signs were installed at both locations.

== Discography ==
=== Solo albums ===
Album	Year	Notes
American Peasant	2004	Recorded live
