= List of people from Holyoke, Massachusetts =

The people listed below were all born in, residents of, or otherwise closely associated with the city of Holyoke, Massachusetts, U.S.

== Notable people ==
(B) denotes that the person was born there.

=== Academics and educators ===
- Lois Green Carr (1922–2015), American historian whose work primarily focused on Chesapeake Bay; daughter of Constance McLaughlin Green (B)
- Joseph Ellis (born 1943), Pulitzer Prize-winning American historian best known for his work on the founders of the United States
- Henrietta Hooker (1851–1929), botanist and educator, among the first women to receive a doctorate in botany from an American university
- Constance McLaughlin Green (1897–1975), Pulitzer Prize-winning American historian best known for her history of Washington, D.C.; her dissertation and first major published work was a comprehensive history of Holyoke
- Justin Perkins (1805–1869), Presbyterian missionary, and linguist, described as an "apostle to Persia" (B)
- Edward Pinkowski (1916–2020), writer, journalist, and historian whose focus was Polish-American history; best remembered as re-discoverer of the bones of Casimir Pulaski (B)
- Dorothy E. Reilly (1920–1996), nurse, played instrumental role in the development of nursing education in the United States and Canada; inductee in American Nurses Association Hall of Fame (B)
- Ervin Staub (born 1938), professor emeritus of psychology, at the University of Massachusetts Amherst; founding director of the doctoral program on the psychology of peace and violence
- Morris Swadesh (1909–1967), linguist known for the Swadesh list, a compilation of unifying concepts across cultures for the purposes of comparative linguistics (B)
- David E. Sweet (1933–1984), founding president of Metropolitan State University and later president of Rhode Island College (B)
- Eric Toensmeier (born 1970), lecturer in permaculture and regenerative agriculture at Yale University, author of Paradise Lot, documenting his work with Jonathan Bates converting a house in Holyoke into a permaculture garden

=== Artists ===
- Arthur Adams (born 1963), comic book artist known for his work on Longshot and Monkeyman and O'Brien (B)
- William Chadwick (1879–1962), British-born American Impressionist painter, and member of the Old Lyme art colony
- Jerome Connor (1874–1943), Irish-born 19th-century sculptor
- Ray D'Addario (1920–2011), photographer best known for his work as the chief photographer of the Nuremberg trials, whose portraits are found in all contemporary news reports and history books covering the postwar trial of Nazi leadership (B)
- Mitch Epstein (born 1952), fine-art photographer, director, cinematographer, and production designer (B)
- Gary Hallgren (born 1945), illustrator and underground cartoonist whose work has appeared in publications including The New York Times and MAD
- William Wegman (born 1943), photographer best known for his compositions posing Weimaraners in costume; his work has been featured on Sesame Street (B)

=== Business and industry ===
- Michael J. Kittredge II (1952–2019), businessman, founder of the Yankee Candle Company; alumnus of Holyoke Community College; opened his first factory in a Holyoke mill before relocating to South Deerfield
- Junius Spencer Morgan (1813–1890), businessman, father of J. P. Morgan (B)
- Belle Skinner (1866–1928), businesswoman and philanthropist who donated Wistariahurst to the city, and worked with Holyoke's government to reconstruct the village of Apremont, France after the First World War
- J. Lewis Wyckoff (1864–1931), businessman and co-founder of stationery manufacturer White & Wyckoff, golf promoter, and credited with Holyoke's 1909 annexation of Smith's Ferry

=== Clergy ===
- Timothy Joseph Harrington (1918–1997), Roman Catholic clergyman, cishop of Worcester (Massachusetts) 1983–1994
- Leo Edward O'Neil (1928–1997), Auxiliary Bishop of Springfield (1980–1989), 6th cishop of Manchester NH (1990–1997)

=== Government and law ===
- David M. Bartley (born 1935), politician and educator (B)
- Stanley C. Cox (1883–1942), physician and head of the Medical Division of the Office of Civilian Defense during World War II
- Maurice A. Donahue (1918–1999), Massachusetts state representative and president of the Massachusetts Senate (B)
- Eileen Donoghue (born 1954), former member of Massachusetts Senate, city manager of Lowell, Massachusetts (B)
- Donald Dwight (born 1931), newspaper executive of Holyoke Telegram-Transcript Dwight family, 64th lieutenant governor of Massachusetts during Governor Francis Sargent's administration (B)
- Bob Goodlatte, U.S. representative from Virginia, served as chair of the House Judiciary Committee (2013–2019) and chair of the House Agriculture Committee (2003–2007) (B)
- Marshall Green (1916–1998), assistant secretary of state (B)
- Robert Jubinville (born 1946), member of the Massachusetts Governor's Council and one of three board-certified criminal trial attorneys in the Commonwealth (B)
- François A. Pouliot (1896–1990), member of the Legislative Assembly of Quebec (B)
- Grace Mary Stern (1925–1998), Illinois state legislator; born in Holyoke (B)
- William Whiting, former member of the U.S. House of Representatives from Massachusetts
- William Fairfield Whiting, former U.S. secretary of commerce

=== Military ===
- Ralph T. Browning (1941–2018), Air Force brigadier general (retired), POW of the Vietnam War, CEO of Greater Phoenix Leadership, Inc. (B)
- Curtis LeMay (1906–1990), Air Force general who strategized the US bombardment of the Pacific Theater in World War II; stationed at Westover Air Reserve Base with the 34th Bombardment Group, winter 1940–1941
- John MacKenzie (1886–1933), Navy chief petty officer, Medal of Honor recipient, namesake of Mackenzie Stadium
- Joseph Metcalf III (1927–2007), Navy vice admiral, operational commander for all US forces during Invasion of Grenada (B)
- James F. Moriarty (1891–1981), Marine Corps brigadier general (B)
- Theodore J. Wojnar, U.S. Coast Guard rear admiral

=== Music ===
- Chuck Andrus (1928–1997), professional double-bassist, played with Terry Gibbs and Woody Herman among other jazz musicians (B)
- Hal Blaine (1929–2019), professional drummer, member of the Rock and Roll Hall of Fame, member of The Wrecking Crew (B)
- Larry Chesky (1933–2011), polka band leader, inducted in 1985 in the International Polka Hall of Fame in Chicago, and manager of the Polka record label Rex Records (B)
- Morris Goldenberg (1919–1969), percussionist, taught at Juilliard and developed a series of widely used percussionist education books, staff musician of New York's WOR, and NBC; inductee of Percussive Arts Society Hall of Fame (B)
- William Churchill Hammond (1860–1949), organist, choirmaster, and music educator influential in establishing Mount Holyoke College's music major
- Ron Hurst (born 1950), drummer, member of the band Steppenwolf 1984–2018 (B)
- Jim Manley (born 1940), songwriter and pastor, known for 1975 hymn "Spirit", included as song number 319 in Presbyterian Hymnal (B)
- Kurt Riley (born 1987), rock and roll musician (B)

=== Scientists and engineers ===
- Thaddeus Cahill (1867–1934), electrical engineer and inventor of the first electromechanical musical instrument, known as the teleharmonium, which he first demonstrated to a public audience at his laboratory in Holyoke, and which contained components that filled 30 boxcars on shipment to New York City
- Michael Dacey (1842–1930), geographer known for his contributions to mathematical models in quantitative geography (B)
- Clemens Herschel (1842–1930), hydraulic engineer and inventor who developed the Venturi meter while working for the Holyoke Water Power Company
- Montgomery Knight (1901–1943), pioneer in rotorcraft design, first director of the Guggenheim School of Aeronautics at the Georgia Institute of Technology and a founder of and long-time researcher at the Georgia Tech Research Institute
- John B. McCormick (1834–1924), mechanical engineer and inventor who designed the Hercules turbine, the first modern mixed flow water turbine, which he developed at the Holyoke Machine Company
- Homer E. Newell Jr. (1915–1983), mathematics professor and NASA administrator, oversaw nearly all unmanned space missions in the Western world from the early 1960s until his retirement in 1974; recipient of the 1965 President's Award for Distinguished Federal Civilian Service (B)
- Jim Prentice (1909–2005), board game designer who developed the first electronic board game, Electric Baseball (B)
- Edward H. Sussenguth (1932–2015), electrical engineer best known for his development of IBM's Systems Network Architecture in the 1970s and contributions to data tree structuring (B)
- Ashley B. Tower (1847–1901), paper millwright, civil engineer
- David H. Tower (1832–1907), paper millwright, mechanical engineer

=== Sports ===
- Bob Adams (1901–1996), Major League Baseball pitcher who played two games for the Boston Red Sox, later coaching the Lehigh Engineers (B)
- Paul Azinger (born 1960), professional golfer, winner of 1993 PGA Championship, and captain of the 2008 U.S. Ryder Cup team (B)
- Jack Buck (1924–2002), sportscaster in Baseball Hall of Fame (B)
- Dick Burns (1863–1937), 19th-century MLB pitcher and outfielder (B)
- Sam Carrigan (1921–2008), Major League Baseball umpire who worked four full seasons in the American League (B)
- Joan Newton Cuneo (1876–1934), race car driver, known for her competence and winning races against drivers both male and female; her successful career influenced a subsequent ban on women in racing (B)
- Jack Doyle (1869–1958), Irish American baseball player who settled in Holyoke and served as police commissioner 1908–09
- Jeff Eisenberg (born 1956), professional hockey and advertising executive, whose first position as a general assistant manager of a sports team began with the Holyoke Millers in the summer of 1980
- Peter Fatse (born 1987), professional baseball coach, assistant hitting coach for the Boston Red Sox (B)
- Kenny Gamble (born 1965), former college football record breaker and NFL running back (B)
- Gerry Geran (1896–1981), Olympic silver medalist, first American-born player in the National Hockey League (B)
- Fran Healy (born 1946), Major League Baseball catcher for the Kansas City Royals, San Francisco Giants, and New York Yankees; broadcaster for the Yankees and New York Mets
- Jessica Huot (born 1983), former competitive ice dancer for Finland, Finnish national champion 2002–2004 (B)
- Eddie Hurley (1908–1969), Major League Baseball umpire (B)
- J. J. Jennings (born 1952), American football tailback and fullback who played for Rutgers in college, and opted to play in the short-lived World Football League rather than being drafted to the NFL (B)
- Mike LaPlante (born 1966), college basketball head coach, NBA scout and lawyer
- Joe Lapchick (1900–1970), professional basketball player who played for the Interstate Basketball League's Holyoke Reds and Original Celtics
- Frank Leja (1936–1991), Major League Baseball first baseman for the New York Yankees and Los Angeles Angels (B)
- Dean Lombardi (born 1958), general manager of NHL's Los Angeles Kings (B)
- Joe Lucey (1897–1980), pitcher and shortstop in Major League Baseball for the Boston Red Sox and New York Yankees (B)
- George Malley (born 1955), long-distance runner who broke the American men's 12 km record for road races at Holyoke on March 21, 1981
- Roger Marquis (1937–2004), right fielder who played a single game and registered one at bat for the Baltimore Orioles in 1955 at the age of 18 (B)
- Frank McCoy (1881–1954), American football coach, head coach of the University of Maine (B)
- William G. Morgan (1870–1942), inventor of volleyball, first developed as the sport "Mintonette" at the Holyoke YMCA
- Archie Roberts (born 1942), former college football and NFL quarterback; heart surgeon (B)
- Donald Ross (1872–1948), Scottish-American professional golfer; notable golf course architect who was initially backed by J. Lewis Wyckoff
- H. R. Schenker (1882–1922), American football and baseball coach; head football coach for the Duke Blue Devils football University of Texas at Austin (B)
- Herman G. Steiner (1897–1982), American football, baseball, and track coach; head football coach for the Duke Blue Devils football program
- Tommy Tucker (1863–1935), Major League Baseball first baseman who spent most of his career with the Boston Beaneaters, precursor to the Boston Braves (B)
- Nelson Vargas (born 1974), Major League Soccer forward for the Tampa Bay Mutiny and Miami Fusion, recipient of 4 caps with the U.S. Men's National Soccer Team, member of 1996 US Olympic soccer team (B)
- Mickey Welch (1859–1941), Major League Baseball pitcher, nicknamed "Smiling Mickey"; spent most of his professional career with the New York Giants
- Mark Wohlers (born 1970), MLB relief pitcher who won a World Series in 1995 with the Atlanta Braves (B)

=== Stage and screen ===
- Michael Berresse (born 1964), actor, choreographer, and stage director (B)
- Pauline Curley (1903–2000), vaudevillian and silent film actress in the early 20th century (B)
- Ann Dowd (born 1956), Emmy award-winning actress (B)
- Ormi Hawley (1889–1942), actress in silent films, reportedly appearing in more than 300 motion pictures (B)
- Hal Holbrook (1925–2021), Emmy award-winning actor, member of the Valley Players at Mountain Park, 1941–1962
- T. J. Jagodowski (born 1971), actor and comedian
- Bambi Jones (born 1931), burlesque performer, vedette, inductee in the Burlesque Hall of Fame (B)
- Melanie Kinnaman (born 1954), actress (B)
- Rachel Maddow (born 1973), television host, political commentator, and Rhodes Scholar; got her first broadcasting job in 1999 at WRNX (100.9 FM) in Holyoke
- Michael Nozik (born 1954), film producer, recipient of 2004 award from the British Academy of Film and Television Arts for his work on The Motorcycle Diaries (B)
- Steve Porter (born 1978), award-winning music video producer, remixer and DJ, owning and operating Porterhouse Media
- Eva Tanguay (1879–1947), the "I Don't Care Girl", vaudevillian

=== Writers ===
- Polly Adler (1900–1962), madam connected to Lucky Luciano, ran a bordello frequented by celebrities and a New York mayor, known for work A House Is Not a Home, posthumously made into a film by the same name
- Donald Bevan (1920–2013), World War II combat veteran, playwright and writer of Stalag 17 (B)
- Lettie S. Bigelow (1849–1906), poet and author
- Mary Doyle Curran (1917–1981), poet and novelist (B)
- Jacques Ducharme (1910–1993), writer and historian, wrote The Delusson Family, a story of a French-Canadian family in Holyoke, and the first Franco-American novel in the English language to be nationally published (B)
- Sherri Browning Erwin (1968–present), writer (B)
- Bartholomew Gill (1943–2002), crime fiction and mystery novelist, newspaper features writer, and columnist writing on nature and outdoor recreation for The Star-Ledger (B)
- John Clellon Holmes (1926–1988), author best known for Go, the first published novel depicting the Beat Generation (B)
- Raymond Kennedy (1934–2008), novelist; set many of his books in a fictionalized Holyoke that he called "Ireland Parish" and "Hadley Falls"
- Charles Palliser (born 1947), novelist whose most famous work, The Quincunx, has sold more than a million copies and won the 1991 Sue Kaufman Prize for First Fiction (B)
- Stanley Reynolds (1934–2016), journalist, author, and critic who spent most of his life in the United Kingdom, and was a regular contributor to The Guardian (B)
- Neil Sheehan (1936–2021), author of A Bright Shining Lie: John Paul Vann and America in Vietnam (B)
- Elizabeth Towne (1865–1960), influential writer, editor, and publisher in the New Thought and self-help movements; first woman to run, unsuccessfully, for mayor of Holyoke

== See also ==
- List of mayors of Holyoke, Massachusetts
