= Urban history =

Study of the past of cities

Urban history is a field of history that examines the historical nature of cities and towns, and the process of urbanization. The historiographical approach is often multidisciplinary, crossing boundaries into fields like social history, architectural history, urban sociology, urban geography, business history, and archaeology. Urbanization and industrialization were popular themes for 20th-century historians, often tied to an implicit model of modernization, or the transformation of rural traditional societies.

Scholars studying the history of urbanization focus on the processes of by which existing populations concentrate in urban localities over time, and on the social, political, cultural and economic contexts of cities. Most urban scholars focus on the "metropolis," a large or especially important city. There is much less attention to small cities, towns or (until recently) suburbs. However social historians find small cities much easier to handle because they can use census data to cover or sample the entire population. In the United States from the 1920s to the 1990s many of the most influential monographs began as one of the 140 PhD dissertations at Harvard University directed by Arthur Schlesinger, Sr. (1888–1965) or Oscar Handlin (1915-2011). The field grew rapidly after 1970, leading one prominent scholar, Stephan Thernstrom, to note that urban history apparently deals with cities, or with city-dwellers, or with events that transpired in cities, with attitudes toward cities – which makes one wonder what is not urban history.

== Comparative studies ==
Only a handful of studies attempt a global history of cities, notably Lewis Mumford, The City in History (1961). Representative comparative studies include Leonardo Benevolo, The European City (1993); Christopher R. Friedrichs, The Early Modern City, 1450-1750 (1995), and James L. McClain, John M. Merriman, and Ugawa Kaoru. eds. Edo and Paris (1994) (Edo was the old name for Tokyo).

Architectural history is its own field but occasionally overlaps with urban history.

The political role of cities in helping state formation—and in staying independent—is the theme of Charles Tilly and W. P. Blockmans, eds., Cities and the Rise of States in Europe, A.D. 1000 to 1800 (1994). Comparative elite studies—who was in power—are typified by Luisa Passerini, Dawn Lyon, Enrica Capussotti and Ioanna Laliotou, eds. Who Ran the Cities? City Elites and Urban Power Structures in Europe and North America, 1750-1940 (2008) . Labor activists and socialists often had national or international networks that circulated ideas and tactics.

== Great Britain ==
In the 1960s, the historiography of Victorian towns and cities began to flourish in Britain. Much attention focused first on the Victorian city, with topics ranging from demography, public health, the working-class, and local culture. In recent decades, topics regarding class, capitalism, and social structure gave way to studies of the cultural history of urban life, as well as the study of groups such as women, prostitutes, migrants from rural areas, and immigrants from the Continent and from the British Empire. The urban environment itself became a major topic, as studies of the material fabric of the city, and the structure of urban space, became more prominent.

Historians have almost always focused on London, but they have also studied smaller towns and cities from the medieval period, as well as the urbanization that attended the industrial revolution. In the second half of the 19th century, provincial centres such as Birmingham, Glasgow, Leeds, Liverpool, and Manchester doubled in size and became regional capitals. They were all conurbations that included smaller cities and suburbs in their catchment area. Available scholarly materials have become quite comprehensive today.

== Urban biography ==
Urban biography is the narrative history of a city and often reaches a general audience. Urban biographies cover the interrelationships among various dimensions, such as politics, demography, business, high culture, popular culture, housing, neighbourhoods, and ethnic groups. It covers municipal government as well as physical expansion, growth and decline. Historians often focus on the largest and most dominant city—usually the national capital—which geographers call a "primate city."

Some representative urban biographies are:

- Edwin G. Burrows and Mike Wallace. Gotham: a history of New York City to 1898 (2000)
- S. G. Checkland, The Upas Tree: Glasgow, 1875–1975 (1981)
- Geoffrey Cotterell, Amsterdam, The Life of a City (1972)
- Janet Abu-Lughod, Cairo; 1001 Years of City Victorious (1971)
- Diane E. Davis, Urban Leviathan: Mexico City in the Twentieth Century (1994)
- Constance McLaughlin Green, Washington, Village and Capital, 1800–1878 (1962)
- Christopher Hibbert, London, the Biography of a City (1969)
- Robert Hughes, Barcelona (1992)
- Colin Jones. Paris: Biography of a City (2004)
- Blake McKelvey. Rochester (4 vol, 1961), Rochester NY
- Simon Sebag Montefiore, Jerusalem: The Biography (2012)
- Bessie Louise Pierce, A History of Chicago (3 vol 1957), to 1893.
- Roy Porter, London: A Social History (1998)
- Alexandra Ritchie, Faust's Metropolis: A History of Berlin (1998)
- James Scobie, Buenos Aires: Plaza to Suburb (1974)
- Ronald Taylor, Berlin and its Culture: A Historical Portrait (1997), considers literature, music, theater, painting, and decorative arts.

Historians have developed typologies of cities, emphasizing their geographic location and economic specialization. In the United States Carl Bridenbaugh was a pioneer in historiography. He emphasized the major port cities on the East Coast, the largest of which were Boston and Philadelphia, each with fewer than 40,000 people at the time of the American Revolution. Other historians have covered the port cities up and down the East Coast, the Gulf Coast, and the West Coast, along with the river ports along the Ohio, Mississippi, and Missouri rivers. Industrialization began in New England, and several small cities have scholarly histories. The railroad cities of the West, stretching from Chicago to Kansas City to Wichita to Denver have been well treated. Blake McKelvey provides an encyclopedic overview of the functions of major cities in The Urbanization of America, 1860–1915 (1963), and The Emergence of Metropolitan America, 1915–1966 (1968)

== Large-scale reference books ==
Peter Clark of the Urban History Center of the University of Leicester was the general editor (and Cambridge University Press the publisher) of a massive history of British cities and towns, running 2800 pages in 75 chapters by 90 scholars. The chapters deal not with biographies of individual cities, but with economic, social or political themes that cities had in common. Two highly influential, authoritative and comprehensive compendia of European urban history were also compiled by Barry Haynes of the Centre for Urban History at Leicester University in 1990 and 1991, published by Leicester University. These books made a significant contribution to the bibliographic review of urban history research and literature in both Eastern and Western Europe.

In the United States a very different approach was sponsored by the National Endowment for the Humanities has sponsored large historical encyclopedias for many states and several cities, most notably the Encyclopedia of Chicago (2004; also online edition) and The Encyclopedia of New York City (1995, 2nd ed. 2010) They followed the model of an earlier encyclopedia of Cleveland and relished the details about neighbourhoods, people, organizations and events, without imposing any overall theme.

=== Suburbs ===
A new subgenre is the history of specific suburbs. Historians have concentrated on specific places, typically focusing on the origins of the suburb in relation to the central city, the pattern of growth, different functions (such as residential or industrial), local politics, as well as racial exclusion and gender roles. The main overview is Kenneth T. Jackson's Crabgrass Frontier (1987).

Many people have assumed that early-20th-century suburbs were enclaves for middle-class whites, a concept that carries tremendous cultural influence yet is actually stereotypical. Many suburbs are based on a heterogeneous society of working-class and minority residents, many of whom share the American Dream of upward social status via home ownership. Sies (2001) argues that it is necessary to examine how "suburb" is defined as well as the distinction made between cities and suburbs, geography, economic circumstances, and the interaction of numerous factors that move research beyond acceptance of stereotyping and its influence on scholarly assumptions.

== New urban history ==
The "new urban history" emerged in the 1960s as a branch of Social history seeking to understand the "city as process" and, through quantitative methods, to learn more about the inarticulate masses in the cities, as opposed to the mayors and elites. Much of the attention is devoted to individual behaviour, and how the intermingling of classes and ethnic groups operated inside a particular city. Smaller cities are much easier to handle when it comes to tracking a sample of individuals over ten or 20 years.

Common themes include social and political changes, examinations of class formation, and racial/ethnic tensions. A major early study was Stephan Thernstrom's Poverty and Progress: Social Mobility in a Nineteenth Century City (1964), which used census records to study Newburyport, Massachusetts, 1850–1880. A seminal, landmark book, it sparked interest in the 1960s and 1970s in quantitative methods, census sources, "bottom-up" history, and the measurement of upward social mobility by different ethnic groups.

Other exemplars of the new urban history included

- Kathleen Conzen, Immigrant Milwaukee, 1836–1860 (1976)
- David F. Crew. Town in the Ruhr: A Social History of Bochum, 1860–1914 (1986)
- Alan Dawley, Class and Community: The Industrial Revolution in Lynn (1975; 2nd ed. 2000)
- Michael B. Katz, The People of Hamilton, Canada West (1976)
- Eric H. Monkkonen, The Dangerous Class: Crime and Poverty in Columbus Ohio 1860–1865 (1975)

There were no overarching social history theories that emerged developed to explain urban development. Inspiration from urban geography and sociology, as well as a concern with workers (as opposed to labour union leaders), families, ethnic groups, racial segregation, and women's roles, have proven useful. Historians now view the contending groups within the city as "agents" who shape the direction of urbanization. The sub-field has flourished in Australia—where most people live in cities. Demographic perspectives make use of the large volume of census data from the mid-19th century.

Rather than being strictly areas of geographical segmentation, spatial patterns and concepts of place reveal the struggles for power of various social groups, including gender, class, race, and ethnic identity. The spatial patterns of residential and business areas give individual cities their distinct identities and, considering the social aspects attendant to the patterns, create a more complete picture of how those cities evolved, shaping the lives of their citizens.

New techniques include the use of historical GIS data.

== Non-Western cities ==
Since the 1980s extensive research has been done on the cities of the Ottoman Empire, where standardized record-keeping and centralized archives have facilitated work on Aleppo, Damascus, Byblos, Sidon, Jericho, Hama, Nablus and Jerusalem. Historians have explored the social bases of political factionalism, histories of elites and commoners, different family structures and gender roles, marginalized groups such as prostitutes and slaves, and relationships between Muslims and Christians and Jews. Increasingly work is underway on African cities, as well as South Asia.

In China, the Maoist ideology privileged the uprising of the peasants as the central force in Chinese history, which led to a neglect of urban history until the 1980s. Academics were then allowed to assert that peasant rebellions were often reactionary rather than revolutionary and that China's modernizers of the 1870s made significant advances, even if they were capitalists.

For over a century—since Heinrich Schliemann searched for and found ancient Troy—archaeologists and ancient historians have studied the cities of the ancient world.

== Images and cultural role ==
The study of the culture of specific cities and the role of cities in shaping national culture is a more recent development which provides nontraditional ways of "reading" cities. A representative class is Carl E. Schorske, Fin-De-Siecle Vienna: Politics and Culture (1980). The basis for some of this approach stems from a post-modern theory including the cultural anthropology of Clifford Geertz. One example is Alan Mayne's The Imagined Slum: Newspaper Representation in Three Cities, 1870-1914(1993), a study of how slums were represented in the newspapers in Sydney, San Francisco, and Birmingham. The accounts provided dramatic life stories but failed to integrate the agendas and animosities of city officials, property owners, residents, and local businessmen. As a result, they did not reveal the true inner-city social structures. Nevertheless, the middle class accepted the image of and decided to act on the social constructions, leading to the reformers' demands for slum clearance and urban renewal.

As Rosen and Tarr point out, environmental history has made great strides since the 1970s, but its focus is primarily on rural areas, leading to a neglect of urban issues such as air pollution, sewage, clean water—and the concentration of large numbers of horses. Historians are beginning to integrate urban history and environmental history. Thus far most of the attention concerns the negative impact on the environment, rather than how the environment shaped the urbanization process.

=== Literature and philosophy ===
In literature, the city has long stood as one of the most potent symbols of human capacities and nature. As the largest and most enduring creation of human imagination and hands, and as the largest and most sustained site of human association and interaction, the city has been seen as a marker of what humans are and of what they do. This signification has almost always been shaded with ambivalence. In old legends, epics, and utopias, cities (both actual and symbolic) appeared as places of exceptional but also contradictory meaning. The histories of Troy, Babel, Sodom, Babylon, and Rome were viewed, in Western cultures, as standing for human power, wisdom, creativity, and vision, but also for human presumption, perversion, and fated destruction. Images of the modern city restated this ambivalence with fresh intensity. Great modern cities like London, Paris, Berlin, and New York, have repeatedly been portrayed as sites of opportunity and peril, power and helplessness, vitality and decadence, creativity and perplexity. This contradictory face of the city has appeared so often in Western thought as to suggest an essential psychological and cultural anxiety about human civilization, an anxiety about humanity's relation to their created world and about "humanity" itself. This is especially true of the “modern” city, filled with human artifice and moral contradiction.

== Scholarship ==
The Urban History Association was founded in 1988 with 284 members; it now has over 400. Since 1974 it has published the quarterly Journal of Urban History, with articles and reviews. The association also awards prizes for books, articles, and PhD dissertations.

H.J. Dyos (1921–1978) at the University of Leicester was the leading promoter of urban history in Britain, leading the way, especially into the study of Victorian cities. He formed the Urban History Study Group in 1962; its newsletter became the Urban History Yearbook (1974-1991) and then the journal Urban History (1992–present). His edited volume on The Study of Urban History (1968) opened up the methodology and stimulated young scholars, as did the conferences he organized and the book series he edited. Dyos rejected the quantitative methods of the New Urban History because he was not interested in the individual people in the city, but in the larger social structure, such as the slum or the entire city.

Since 1993, the daily email discussion list H-Urban has enabled historians, graduate students and others interested in urban history and urban studies to communicate current research and research interests easily; to query and discuss new approaches, sources, methods, and tools of analysis; and to comment on contemporary historiography. The logs are open to searches, and membership is free. H-Urban seeks to inform historians on such matters as announcements, calls for papers, conferences, awards, fellowships, availability of new sources and archives, reports on new research, and teaching tools, including books, articles, works-in-progress, research reports, primary historical documents (for example, model ordinances, federal/state/local reports, addresses of city officials), syllabi, bibliographies, software, datasets, and multimedia publications or projects. It commissions its own book reviews. H-Urban has 2,856 subscribers (as of 2012) and is the oldest of the H-Net network of discussion lists.

The history of European urbanism in the 20th century is the focus of urbanHIST, a current Horizon 2020 European Joint Doctorate programme. It is based on the inherent multidisciplinary approach of the research field and the goal of gaining a pan-European perspective on planning history.

== See also ==
- American urban history
- Center for Urban History of East Central Europe
- Cities in the Great Depression, (1929-1939), worldwide
- Gilded Age Plains City, online resources for American Midwest
- Danish Center of Urban History
- History of cities in Canada
- Social history
- Suburb
- History of urban planning
  - Town and Country Planning Association
  - Urban planning
- Urban economics
- Urban studies
  - Index of urban studies articles
- Urbanization

=== Cities ===
- List of oldest continuously inhabited cities
- Cities of East Asia
- History of Beijing
- History of Berlin
- History of Chicago
- History of London
- History of Manila
- History of Mexico City
- History of Naples
- History of New York City
- History of Paris
- History of Philadelphia
- History of Rome
- History of Vienna
