= Oliver Johnson's Woods Historic District =

Historic district in Indiana, United States

- U.S. National Register of Historic Places
- U.S. Historic district
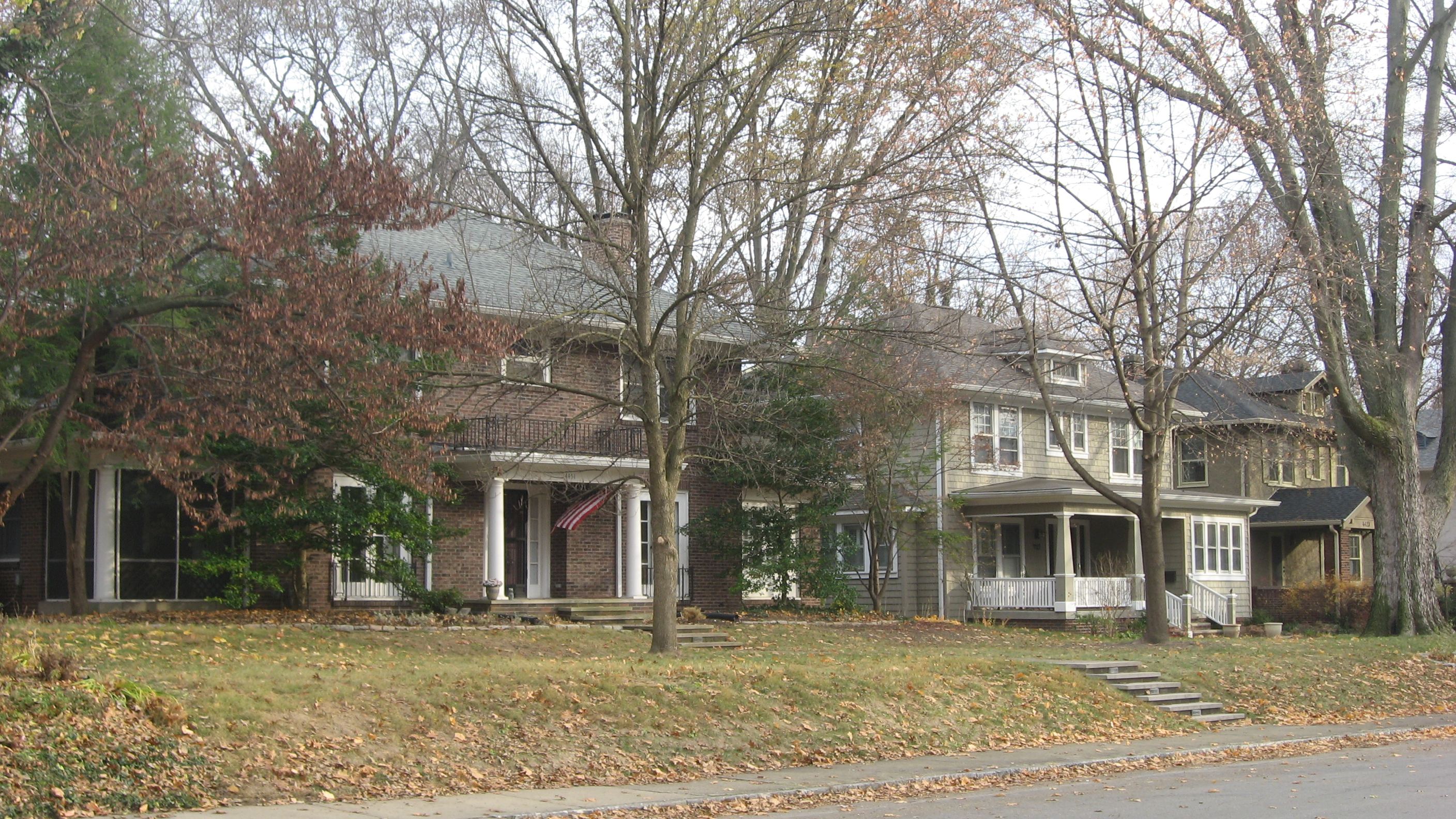
- Park Avenue in the neighborhood

- Location within Indianapolis Location within Indiana Location within the United States
- Location: Roughly bounded by Central and College Aves., 44th and 46th Sts., Indianapolis, Indiana
- Coordinates: 39°50′23″N 86°8′51″W
- Area: 40 acres (16 ha)
- Architect: William F. Nelson, Fermor Spencer Cannon, et al.
- Architectural style: Colonial Revival, Renaissance, et al.
- NRHP reference No.: 04000632
- Added to NRHP: June 22, 2004

Oliver Johnson's Woods is a historic district and neighborhood on the northern side of Indianapolis, Indiana, United States. Located in southern Washington Township, the district occupies the site of what was once the family farm of Oliver Johnson. Born on the present site of the Indiana State Fairgrounds, Johnson grew up in a pioneer family that lived on the edge of the state capital city. Upon attaining adulthood, he bought property a short distance to the west, to which he moved in 1846. Here, he built a larger farmhouse in 1862, and he tilled the soil for most of the rest of his life. As Indianapolis grew northward, it reached the Johnson farm in the early twentieth century; the aged farmer and his sons saw the city's growth as an opportunity for financial gain, and in 1905 they announced the platting of 0.25 square miles (0.65 km^{2}) of their property into individual lots. They chose an advantageous time to sell their property; as the new residents began to build their homes, an interurban railway was built along College Avenue on the district's western side that connected downtown with Broad Ripple. Many prosperous businessmen were attracted by the development's large lots and wooded streets; the city annexed Oliver Johnson's Woods in 1912, and by the outbreak of World War II, the streets were filled with large houses built in a wide variety of architectural styles. These early residents came from many different ethnicities: European immigrants were becoming more prosperous and leaving their ethnic enclaves, and new neighborhoods such as Oliver Johnson's Woods appealed to them. Among the neighborhood's leading residents was a colony of Jews of German descent.

Houses in the district generally feature architectural styles that were popular in the early twentieth century, such as the Colonial Revival, the Tudor Revival, the Arts and Crafts, the American Foursquare, and the Prairie School. Many of the district's Colonial Revival houses were constructed by William F. Nelson, who acted both as architect and as general contractor for these projects. Standing out from all other houses in the district is the original Johnson farmhouse; now known as the Johnson-Denny House, it originally faced Central Avenue, but its new owner relocated it to face Park Avenue while the surrounding land was being developed in 1919. Other buildings were once located around the house, but they have not survived.

Today, Oliver Johnson's Woods is surrounded by the Meridian-Kessler neighborhood, and it remains the wooded middle-class neighborhood that it was originally planned to be. In 1979, the Johnson-Denny House was listed on the National Register of Historic Places; it was seen as eligible because of its place in local history and because of its well-preserved historic architecture. Twenty-five years later, all of Oliver Johnson's Woods was designated a historic district and added to the Register because of its architecture and local historical importance. The area designated as historic encompasses approximately 40 acres (16 ha); ninety-two different buildings within this zone qualified as contributing properties. Ninety of these buildings are houses; a 1999 historic preservation survey conducted by Indiana Landmarks ranked four of them as "outstanding," seventeen as "notable," and the other sixty-nine simply as "contributing."

== See also ==
- National Register of Historic Places listings in Marion County, Indiana
