= Crabgrass Frontier =

1985 book by Kenneth T. Jackson

Crabgrass Frontier: The Suburbanization of the United States
- Author: Kenneth T. Jackson
- Language: English
- Genre: History, Urban Planning
- Publisher: Oxford University Press
- Publication date: 1985
- Publication place: United States
- Media type: Print
- ISBN: 0-19-503610-7 (Hard Cover) ISBN 0-19-504983-7 (Paperback)
- Dewey Decimal: 307.7/4 0973
- LC Class: HT384 .U5 J33 1985

Crabgrass Frontier: The Suburbanization of the United States is a book written by historian Kenneth T. Jackson and published in 1985. Extensively researched and referenced, the book takes into account factors that promoted the suburbanization of the United States, such as the availability of cheap land, construction methods, and transportation, as well as federal subsidies for highways and suburban housing.

== Introduction ==
Jackson attempts to broadly interpret the American suburban experience, which he views as unique. He states that "the United States has thus far been unique in four important respects that can be summed up in the following sentence: affluent and middle-class Americans live in suburban areas that are far from their work places, in homes that they own, and in the centre of yards that by urban standards elsewhere are enormous. This uniqueness thus involves population density, home-ownership, residential status, and journey-to-work." His working definition of suburbs has four components: function (non-farm residential), class (middle and upper status), separation (a daily journey-to-work), and density (low relative to older sections). Also dominant in the book is the notion that the wealthy began the flight from the city first—something that the middle classes eventually emulated as city tax rates gradually increased to pay for resulting urban problems—as the poorer classes remained in the older central urban areas.

== Suburbs as substandard ==
From ancient times, the city's primary function was as a central meeting place to conduct business. Jackson argues that before 1815 and the Industrial Revolution, every major city was a "point" on a map that could be walked from edge to centre in two or three hours. Cities had five characteristics:

1. High population density or "congestion", comparable to New York City in the 1980s: 35,000-75,000 residents per square mile.
2. Sharp distinction between country and city. In Europe the demarcation was a literal wall of defense (nowadays city walls may have been replaced by a ring road or business boulevard).
3. Mixture of functions with neighborhoods: without industrial factories, neighborhoods mixed commercial and residential activities.
4. Short distances between work and residence; most people had to walk to work, and often lived and worked in the same building.
5. Centrality of culture and elite residences. The upper classes lived within walking distance of work and cultural activities, while the poor laborers lived on the periphery of the urban areas along with the undesirable smells of trades like animal skin tanning and soap-making.

“Suburbs, then, were socially and economically inferior to cities when wind, muscle, and water were the prime movers of civilisation… Even the word suburb suggested inferior manners, narrowness of view, and physical squalor."

== Transportation innovation ==
Between 1815–1875, however, the situation began to change in the United States. With new transportation alternatives such as the steam ferry, omnibus, the commuter railroad, the horsecar, the elevated railroad, and the cable car came "an exodus that would turn cities inside out and inaugurate a new pattern of suburban affluence and centre despair."

The steam locomotive in the mid 19th century provided the wealthy with the means to live in bucolic surroundings, to socialize in country clubs and still commute to work downtown; these were the railroad suburbs. However, "railroad commuting was not only expensive but… the steam engine generated speed slowly [so] that railroad suburbs were usually discontinuous and separated by …open space."

After the American Civil War came the Age of the Trolley bringing commuting to the middle class and expanding the city. The "extraordinary prosperity and vitality of most urban cores between 1890 and 1950 cannot be understood without reference to the streetcar systems… by the turn of the century, a 'new city,' segregated by class and economic function and encompassing an area triple the size of the older walking city had clearly emerged… [so that] by 1904 inventor Frank Sprague could reasonably claim: "The electric railway has become the most potent factor in our modern life." "In 1890, the number of passengers carried on American street railways (including cable and elevated systems) was more than two billion per year, or more than twice that of the rest of the world combined." Tracks "radiated out from the centre like spokes [forcing] anyone using public transit to rely on the central business district."

The influence of the automobile was initially slow, so that even "as late as 1918 the War Industries Board could regard the shutdown of the entire [automobile] industry as a mere inconvenience." However, "of even greater significance …was the truck [which] could do four times the work of a horse-drawn wagon which took up the same street space." Building roads to facilitate the "removal of horses from cities was widely considered a proper object for the expenditure of public funds. Indeed, the private car was initially regarded as the very salvation of the city, a clean and efficient alternative to the old-fashioned, manure-befouled, odoriferous, space-intensive horse." This effort was so successful that "as Sinclair Lewis' popular 1922 novel Babbitt indicated, the private car had become no longer a luxury, but a necessity of the American middle class."

== Flight from the city ==
"The changing ethnic composition of the urban population also increased middle-class antipathy to the older neighborhoods, as Poles, Italians, Russians, and assorted Eastern and Southern Europeans, most of them Jews or Catholic, poured into the industrialised areas after 1880. Although only one-third of all Americans lived in cities in 1890, two-thirds of all immigrants did. By 1910, about 80 percent of all new arrivals at Ellis Island were remaining in cities, as were 72 percent of all of those 'foreign born'. Toward the end of the nineteenth century, mayors in New York, Chicago, and Boston were being elected by immigrant votes, and the possibility was raised that urban officials might be unwilling to use the police against labor radicals, most of whom came from Europe.

Jackson examined the New Deal's contributions to public housing and concludes that "the result, if not the intent, of the public housing program of the United States was to segregate the races, to concentrate the disadvantaged in inner cities, and to reinforce the image of suburbia as a place of refuge for the problems of race, crime, and poverty." By grading certain areas based on "desirability" i.e., more recently constructed and lacking of minorities, the government, through Home Owners' Loan Corporation encouraged middle class white flight from the city. Meanwhile, the Federal Housing Administration "helped to turn the building industry against the minority and inner-city housing market, and its policies supported the income and inner-city housing market." FHA avoided providing mortgages to those in ethnic or minority neighborhoods, further promoting white flight.

"To this fear were added specific programs to tax property so as to create public improvements and jobs to benefit working class voters. The observation of Lord Bryce that municipal government was 'The conspicuous failure of the United States' was often quoted. The import of such projections was not lost on middle-class families, who often took the opportunity that low price and good transportation afforded to move beyond city jurisdictions."

== Lure of the suburbs ==
"Throughout the nineteenth century… American cities annexed adjacent land and grew steadily… the predominant view in the nineteenth century was the doctrine of forcible annexation." However that would change toward the end of the century: "the first really significant defeat for the consolidation movement came when Brookline spurned Boston in 1874. [Thereafter] virtually every other Eastern and Middle Western city was rebuffed by wealthy and independent suburbs."

By the turn of the 19th century, a middle class expectation of having residential space had emerged, which Jackson attributes to work of Andrew Jackson Downing, Calvert Vaux, and Catharine Beecher. "Family came to be a personal bastion against society, a place of refuge, free from outside control," with "the emerging values of domesticity, privacy, and isolation reach[ing] fullest development in the United States. The big, mean city, with its confidence men and squalor, did not promise the same haven as the suburbs. The "ideal house came to be viewed as resting in the middle of a manicured lawn or picturesque garden."

In 1833 in newly rebuilt Chicago, a new type of building appeared, 'balloon frame,' that "would absorb most of the population growth of the United States over the next one hundred and fifty years." A "new structure could be erected more quickly by two men than the [European-style] heavy timber frame by twenty… [so that] many poorly paid immigrant groups had homeownership rates as high [as] white Americans." "For the first time in the history of the world, middle class families in the late nineteenth century could reasonably expect to buy a detached home on an accessible lot… the real price of shelter in the United States was lower than in the Old World."

Intended to spur housing construction after the Great Depression, President Roosevelt's Federal Housing Administration established minimum standards for home construction and low down-payment amounts, and home loans amortized for the full-term of 20 to 30 years. Before that, "first mortgages were limited to one-of or two-thirds of the appraised value of the property", and loans had to be renewed every five years and interest rates were subject to revision every renewal.

After World War II, encouraged by the emergence of new cities of wartime production and government assistance for veterans, increasing numbers of Americans could afford to buy homes. Given the massive growth of affordable dwellings accessible by the highway and train, families flocked to planned towns such as Levittown where all the details such as schools and public works were already in place so that builders could erect as many as thirty homes a day to meet demand. Most importantly, the decentralization of post-World War II American cities led to the self-sufficiency of the suburbs around the urban core, both as the place of work and place of dwelling.

== Conclusion ==
"Recent changes in Europe support the thesis that suburbanization is a common human aspiration and its achievement is dependent upon technology and affluence. Since William Levitt erected his first houses outside Paris in 1965, the European landscape has become littered with all the trappings of suburban America." "For better or worse, the American suburb is a remarkable and probably lasting achievement."

However, due to the energy inefficiency of the suburb, Jackson believed that the "long process of suburbanization, which has been operative in the United States since about 1815, will slow over the next two decades and that a new kind of spatial equilibrium will result early in the next century."

== Awards ==
Crabgrass Frontier won both the Bancroft Prize, given by Columbia University for the year's best work of history, and the Francis Parkman Prize, awarded by the Society of American Historians.

== Other research on the subject ==
Other writers and academics have written on the subject of the increasing suburbanization of the USA. For instance, some social scientists point out the role played by racism. During World War I, the massive migration of African Americans from the South resulted in an even greater residential shift toward suburban areas. The cities became seen as dangerous, crime-infested areas, while the suburbs were seen as safe places to live and raise a family, leading to a social trend known in some parts of the world as white flight. This phenomenon runs counter to much of the rest of the world, where slums mostly exist outside the city, rather than within them. With the increasing population of the older, more established suburban areas, many of the problems which were once seen as purely urban ones have manifested themselves there as well. These social scientists suggest that the historical processes of suburbanization and decentralization are instances of white privilege that have contributed to contemporary patterns of environmental racism.

One team of writers have analysed the building of the Interstate Highway System, and have concluded that it and other policies of the Federal government played a significant role in American suburbanization. The building of an efficient network of roads, highways and superhighways, and the underwriting of mortgages for suburban one-family homes, had an enormous influence on the pace of suburbanization. In effect, the government was encouraging the transfer of the middle-class population out of the inner cities and into the suburbs, sometimes with devastating effects on the viability of the city centres. However, some argue that the effect of Interstate Highway Systems on suburbanization is overstated. Researchers holding this view believe city centre populations would have declined even in the absence of highway systems, contending that suburbanization is a long-standing and almost universal process. They primarily argue that as incomes rise, most people want the range and choice offered by automobiles.

== Academic journal reviews ==
- Arnold, Joseph L. (1986). "Review: Crabgrass Frontier: The Suburbanization of the United States". The Public Historian. 8 (2): 148–151. doi:10.2307/3377446. JSTOR 3377446.
- Bell, Thomas L. (1986). "Review: Crabgrass Frontier: The Suburbanization of the United States". Geographical Review. 76 (3): 327–329. doi:10.2307/214153. JSTOR 214153.
- Chapelle, Suzanne Ellery Greene (1987). "Review: Crabgrass Frontier: The Suburbanization of the United States., Kenneth T. Jackson". The Journal of Southern History. 53 (2): 350–351. doi:10.2307/2209134. JSTOR 2209134.
- Cunliffe, Marcus (1986). "Review: Crabgrass Frontier: The Suburbanization of the United States". American Studies International. 24 (1): 87. JSTOR 41278834.
- Daniels, Bruce C. (February 1987). "Review: Crabgrass Frontier: The Suburbanization of the United States". Urban History Review. 15 (3). University of Winnipeg: 290–291. ISSN 0703-0428. JSTOR 43559355.
- Desai, Bindu T. (1987). "Review: The Suburban Nation". Economic and Political Weekly. 22 (8): 323–324. JSTOR 4376705.
- Findlay, John M. (1986). "Review: CRABGRASS FRONTIER: The Suburbanization of the United States". American Studies. 27 (2): 63. JSTOR 40642037.
- Goldfield, David R. (1986). "Review: Crabgrass Frontier: The Suburbanization of the United States". The New England Quarterly. 59 (4): 611–613. doi:10.2307/365254. JSTOR 365254.
- Hoffecker, Carol E. (1987). "Review: Crabgrass Frontier: The Suburbanization of the United States". The Journal of Interdisciplinary History. 17 (3): 691–692. doi:10.2307/204639. JSTOR 204639. S2CID 147509483.
- Ling, Peter (1988). "Review: Crabgrass Frontier: The Suburbanization of the United States". Urban History Yearbook. [15]: 184–185. doi:10.1017/S0963926800014085. JSTOR 44608706. S2CID 145736636.
- Marsh, Margaret (1986). "Review: Crabgrass Frontier: The Suburbanization of the United States". The American Historical Review. 91 (3): 755–756. doi:10.2307/1869317. JSTOR 1869317.
- Mohl, Raymond A. (1987). "Review: Crabgrass Frontier: The Suburbanization of the United States". The Florida Historical Quarterly. 65 (4): 508–510. JSTOR 30147859.
- O'Connor, Carol A. (1987). "Review: The Unique Suburban Nation". Reviews in American History. 15 (1): 115–120. doi:10.2307/2702229. JSTOR 2702229.
- Schneider, Eric C. (1986). "Review: Crabgrass Frontier: The Suburbanization of the United States". The Pennsylvania Magazine of History and Biography. 110 (3): 476–478. JSTOR 20092036.
- Sternlieb, George (1986). "Review: Crabgrass Frontier: The Suburbanization of the United States., Kenneth T. Jackson". Political Science Quarterly. 101 (3): 493–494. doi:10.2307/2151640. JSTOR 2151640.
- Teaford, Jon C. (1986). "Review: Crabgrass Frontier: The Suburbanization of the United States". The Journal of American History. 73 (1): 227–228. doi:10.2307/1903693. JSTOR 1903693.
- Wunsch, James L. (1995). "Review: The Suburban Cliche". Journal of Social History. 28 (3): 643–658. doi:10.1353/jsh/28.3.643. JSTOR 3788469.
