= Danish Center of Urban History =

The Danish Center for Urban History (Danish: Dansk Center for Byhistorie) is a research and communication center for the history of cities in Denmark. The center was founded in 2001 by the Institute of History and Area Studies at the University of Aarhus and The Old Town, National Open Air Museum of Urban History and Culture. The Center has two book series called "Danish Urban Studies" and "Writings on Danish Urban History" with books and articles about Danish urban history from the medieval period until today. The center communicates Danish urban history to a wider audience on the internet through a website called The Digital City Gate which gives access to databases and presentations of Danish urban history with emphasis on the period from 1600-1900.

== See also ==
- Urban history
