= Boston–Brookline annexation debate of 1873 =

Political referendum

On October 7, 1873, Brookline, Massachusetts rejected annexation by a larger neighboring city when it voted down annexation by Boston. When its citizens voted 707-299 to keep its independence, Brookline not only stopped Boston's string of annexations, but it also set an example for wealthy suburbs throughout America. The vote was a significant event in the history of American suburbs.

== The development of anti-annexationist Brookline ==
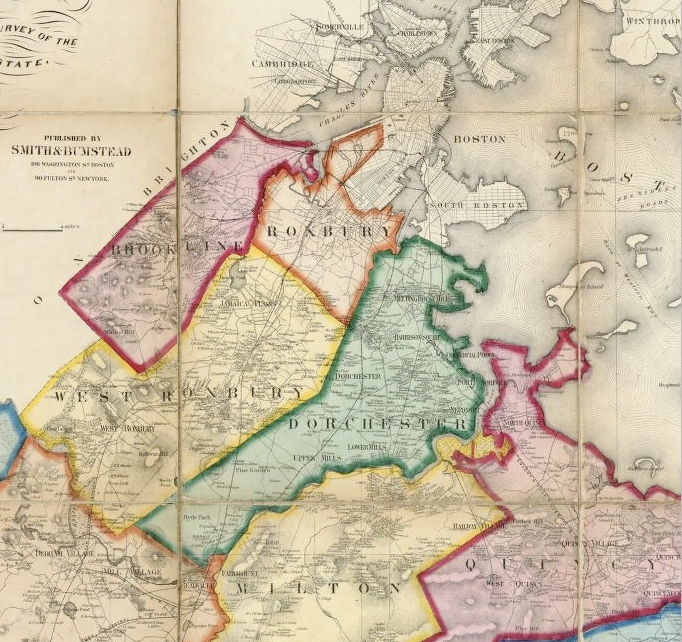
1858 map of the Boston vicinity, showing towns which would later be annexed by Boston

In 1686 a community of farmers to the west of Boston separated itself into a semi-autonomous village called Muddy River Hamlet. Less than twenty years later, in 1705, the Muddy River hamlet was incorporated as an independent town called Brookline. During the 168 years between its creation and Boston's attempt to annex it in 1873, Brookline grew immensely, first as a farming community and later as a commuting town.

At first, Brookline was no different from other rural towns in Massachusetts, but towards the end of the eighteenth century it became an increasingly attractive location for the wealthy Bostonian elite. This led to a great increase in Brookline's population. For example, between 1840 and 1850, the population almost doubled, going from 1,365 to 2,516. Although the town's population quickly increased during the first half of the 19th century, this sudden growth did not much change Brookline's idyllic rural makeup.

The second half of the nineteenth century, however, saw Brookline develop from a purely rural town to, essentially, a residential neighborhood for wealthy Bostonians. The town had quickly changed: it no longer supplied raw materials for the city; it now supplied land for the city's elite. The property in Brookline had become too valuable for the large plots required for farming, so farmers, who only needed to visit Boston sporadically and thus did not necessarily rely on their proximity to the city, moved away from the state's economic hub. Farmland was converted into estates for affluent upper class and upper-middle-class families. The men who headed these households were often lawyers, businessmen or other highly educated professionals who had offices in Boston and thus commuted there on a daily basis.

Such a wealthy population would not, however, go unsupported. A working class population had to supply the basic daily labor that sustains the way of life of the upper class. Brookline quickly developed a largely Irish working population. The Great Irish Famine of the late 1840s created a great migration of willing laborers to the United States. Many of these immigrants were settling in Massachusetts as Brookline's population quickly grew and the need for manual workers increased.

A large group of Irish families settled in an area close to Brookline Village known as The Marsh. The Brookline elite worried about the influx of Irishmen into this previously rather homogeneous community. First and foremost, they worried about the impoverished shanties populated by Irish Roman Catholics, a group which suffered severe discrimination during this era. Moreover, they worried that their impoverished living conditions in a swampy district would spread disease. In the end, though, the local population had to accept that the influx of lower class families was necessary for any wealthy town's economic well-being.

This contrast between the upper class American citizens and the lower class Irish immigrants was made even clearer by the lack of a middle class. Because daily transportation into Boston in the nineteenth century was too expensive for all but the wealthy, the only inhabitants of Brookline were the upper class and those who supported them, since the support class rarely needed to travel into Boston. By the late nineteenth century, forty percent of Brookline's population was Irish.

Even after the Irish influx, Brookline could still be described as a homogeneous town. Now, however, there were two separate homogeneous communities instead of just one. In a few years, Brookline's social simplicity would greatly assist the anti-annexation movement.

== The annexation issue ==
In the five years leading to the attempted annexation of Brookline, some of Boston's most influential suburbs became part of the city. The annexations of Roxbury in 1868, Dorchester in 1870, and Charlestown, Brighton and West Roxbury in 1873 all increased the area and population of the state capital. (See History of Boston, Massachusetts for a complete list.) For these communities, annexation was an achievement: there was interest in uniting the place where they lived and the place where they worked under a single political entity; moreover, these communities realized that Boston could provide certain services that they would have a hard time obtaining for themselves. In Roxbury's case, for example, Boston's water supply and sewage systems were strong stimuli for the annexation movement.

Brookline, however, was socially distinct from its neighboring towns that voted in favor of annexation. Brookline's form of government, the town meeting, allowed every adult male citizen to cast a vote on every law, while a board of five Selectmen was elected as the executive branch of the government. While the anti-annexationists viewed this as the most democratic form of government a town could have, opponents claimed that Boston's more centralized representative political structure could better serve the needs of the community without the threat of corruption.

The reluctance to let go of the current system led to accusations by the annexationists that the upper class was coercing the working class Irishmen into siding with them, since the Irish immigrants relied on the wealthy to supply them with jobs. The truth, however, is that it was in the Irishmen's best interest to keep Brookline separated from Boston. If the status quo did not change, Brookline's Irishmen would maintain their monopoly over all the manual labor done in the town. Thus, they benefited from the continual separation between the two communities.

In only one respect was the elite suburb unable to furnish its citizens with services equal to Boston's---in the quantity and quality of its water supply. Boston's water system which included Lake Cochituate and Cochituate Aqueduct had been providing Boston neighborhoods with ample, high quality water since 1848. The pro-annexation forces contended that only through consolidation with Boston could Brookline procure a reliable supply of water. Anti-annexationists countered this argument by questioning the capacity of the Cochituate System to meet Brookline’s needs, claiming that its capacity was limited, and would shortly be too little to meet even Boston’s water-supply needs.

Although there were big ideological issues behind the annexation issues, such as the anti-annexationists' claim that the metropolis went against the American ideal of republican liberties, the argument always eventually boiled down to specific local concerns.

== Important people ==
Many of those who wished to join Boston wanted it because they would benefit from the city's resources. John W. Candler, one of the leading annexationists, was probably interested in the possibility of an increase in property value that could affect the undeveloped lands that the Brookline Land Company, which he directed, controlled in northern Brookline.

On the other side of the argument were two men who were very different from each other. The upper class leader of the anti-annexationists was William Aspinwall. Born into a wealthy, traditional Brookline family, Aspinwall studied law at Harvard. Despite the fact that he was a Democrat in a strongly Republican town, he was a Brookline Selectman. His strong connection to Brookline politics did not stop Aspinwall from commuting to his law office in Boston on a daily basis.

Even though William Aspinwall had gathered the votes of the upper class, someone who could unite the working class community against annexation was wanted. John McCormack, an alcohol smuggler, was the leader of the Irish population. McCormack benefited from the fact that Brookline's police force was small enough that, by befriending the right people, he could get away with practicing his illicit business.

== The outcome ==
On Tuesday October 7, 1873 the electorate voted to keep Brookline independent by a wide margin. 707 Brookliners voted to keep the town independent against only 299 who voted to accept annexation. Simultaneously, 6,291 Bostonians voted for Brookline's annexation and 1,484 against, but the measure failed without Brookline's consent.

As Kenneth T. Jackson points out in his book Crabgrass Frontier, "the first really significant defeat for the consolidation movement came when Brookline spurned Boston." This was, according to Jackson, the starting point for a massive suburbanization campaign that swept the United States and greatly influenced the American way of life. "After Brookline spurned Boston," Jackson says, "virtually every other Eastern and Middle Western city was rebuffed by wealthy and independent suburbs-Chicago by Oak Park and Evanston, Rochester by Brighton and Irondequoit, and the city of Oakland by Piedmont. […] And, as the suburban trend gained momentum, state legislators became increasingly reluctant to override the wishes of the voters concerned."
