= Johnson–Denny House =

Historic house in Indiana, United States

- U.S. National Register of Historic Places
- U.S. Historic district – Contributing property
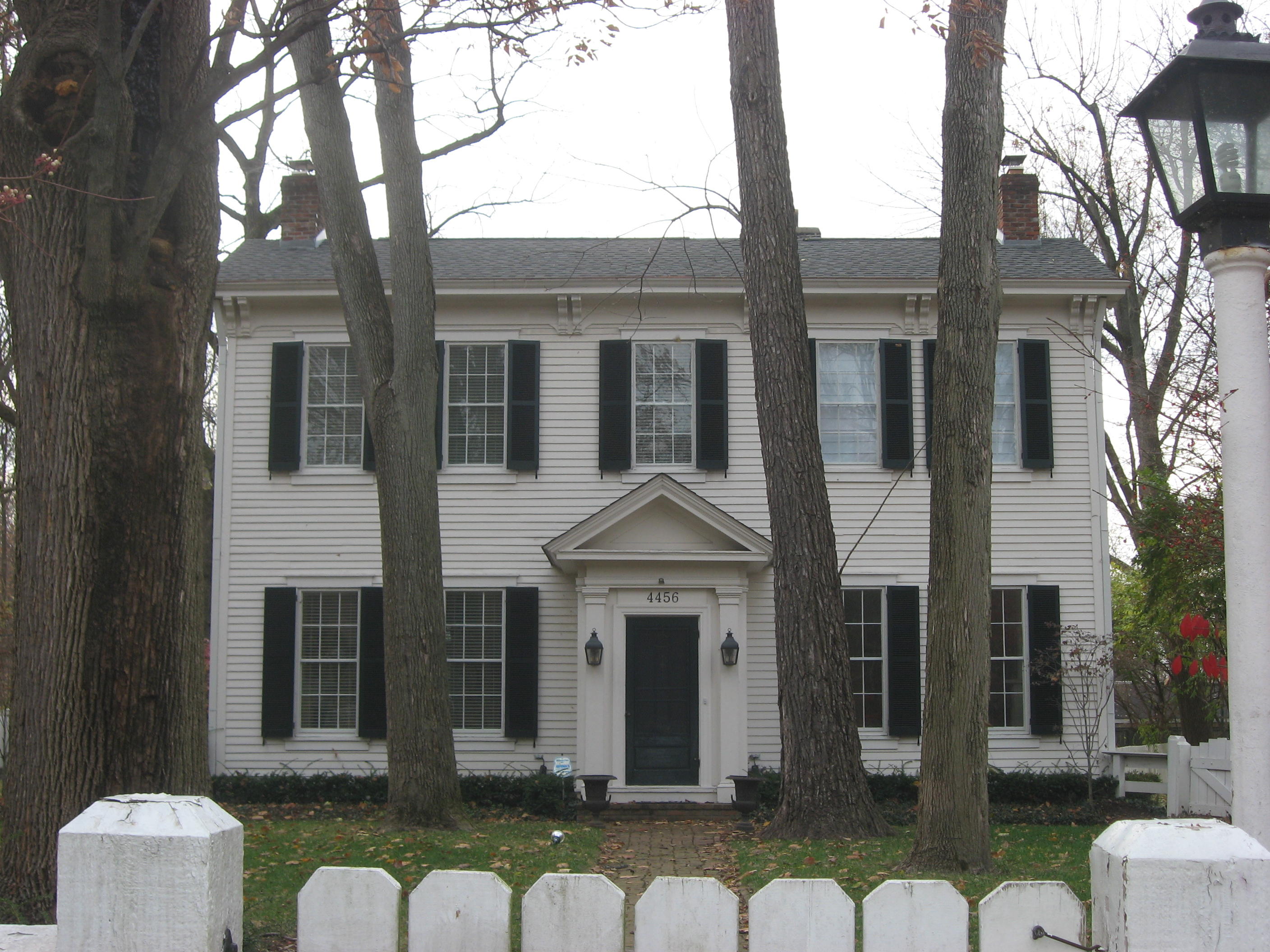
- Johnson-Denny House, November 2010

- Location within Indianapolis Location within Indiana Location within the United States
- Location: 4456 N. Park Ave., Indianapolis, Indiana
- Coordinates: 39°50′15″N 86°8′55″W
- Area: 0.4 acres (0.16 ha)
- Built: 1862, 1920
- Architect: Fatout, Joshua L. & Moses K.
- Architectural style: Italianate
- NRHP reference No.: 79000036
- Added to NRHP: August 24, 1979

Johnson–Denny House, also known as the Johnson-Manfredi House, is a historic home located at Indianapolis, Indiana. It was built in 1862, and is a two-story, five-bay, T-shaped, frame dwelling with Italianate style design elements. It has a bracketed gable roof, and a two-story rear addition. It features a vestibule added in 1920. Also on the property is a contributing 1 1/2-story garage, originally built as a carriage house. It was originally built by Oliver Johnson, noted for the Oliver Johnson's Woods Historic District.

It was added to the National Register of Historic Places in 1979.

== See also ==
- National Register of Historic Places listings in Marion County, Indiana
