= Harold James Dyos =

British historian

Harold James Dyos (1921–1978) was a British historian, known for his contributions to urban history. He wrote many essays addressing the issue of urbanization.

== Career ==
He graduated B.A. from the London School of Economics in 1949, and gained a Ph.D. there in 1952. He taught his entire career at the University of Leicester.

He was promoted to Professor of Urban History at the University of Leicester in 1973, but it was a personal title; there was no department of urban history. He founded the Urban History Newsletter in 1963. The Newsletter was largely replaced by the Urban History Yearbook from 1974, which later became Urban History. His students included David Reeder; he influenced others, including David Cannadine.

He wrote historiographical essays and occasional case studies, especially on the Victorian slum. His joint essay with Reeder Slums and Suburbs postulated a relationship at the level of flows of capital between the appearance, often rapid, of central urban slums, and the development of the peripheral suburbs of a city.

He became Chairman of the Victorian Society in 1976, succeeding Nikolaus Pevsner.

== Works ==
- Victorian Suburb (1961)
- Exploring the Urban Past: Essays in Urban History edited by David Cannadine and David Reeder (1982)
