= Ralph T. Browning =

United States Air Force general (1941–2019)

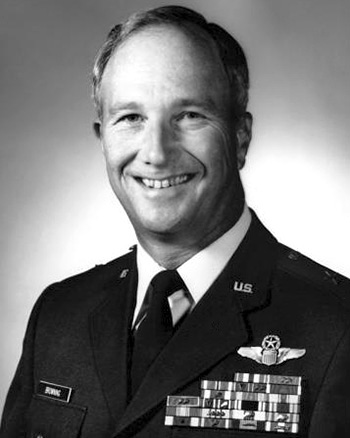
- Ralph T. Browning
- Born: October 25, 1941; Holyoke, Massachusetts, U.S.
- Died: July 7, 2018 (aged 76); Scottsdale, Arizona, U.S.
- Burial place: Arlington National Cemetery
- Spouse(s): Ann (nee Pharr); Julie
- Military career
- Allegiance: United States
- Branch: United States Air Force
- Service years: 1964–1992
- Rank: Brigadier General
- Nickname: Tom
- Commands: 313th Air Division; 832nd Air Division; 58th Fighter Wing
- Conflicts: Vietnam War
- Awards: Air Force Distinguished Service Medal; Silver Star; Legion of Merit (3); Distinguished Flying Cross; Bronze Star Medal (3); Purple Heart

Brigadier General Ralph Thomas "Tom" Browning (25 October 1941 – 7 July 2018) was a United States Air Force command pilot and a prisoner of war (POW) during the Vietnam War. He commanded two air divisions during his career, and was commander of the 58th Fighter Wing, Luke Air Force Base, Arizona. After retirement from the USAF, he became CEO of Greater Phoenix Leadership, Inc. in Phoenix, Arizona, a business organization supporting community improvement efforts in the areas of transportation, education and economic development.

== Early life and education ==
Ralph Thomas Browning was born in Holyoke, Massachusetts, on 25 October 1941 to Sergeant C. K. and Dollie Browning. His father left shortly after his birth to serve in Europe during World War II where he was a navigator/bombardier on a B-17B, shot down and spent 19 months as a POW in Stalag XVII-B, located near Krems, Austria. Since he remained in the Air Force after its formation in 1947, the family traveled around a great deal but ended up in Orlando, Florida, in 1955 where they, with Browning's three younger sisters, lived. While attending Edgewater High School, he personally crowned his wife-to-be, Ann Pharr, as Homecoming Queen.

Browning graduated from Edgewater High in 1960, entering the United States Air Force Academy, Colorado Springs, Colorado on 27 June 1960, a member of the 22d Cadet Squadron. Remaining on the Commandant's List all four years, he made the Superintendent's List the last semester. Cadet Browning earned his Bachelor of Science degree, Engineering Science, on 3 June 1964.

Browning completed Armed Forces Staff College in 1977, Air War College in 1980 and Army War College in 1982. In 1982, he also earned his Master of Science degree in public administration from Shippensburg State College.

== Military career ==
Browning was a 28-year command pilot with more than 2,500 flying hours in the F-105, T-38, F-5, F-15 and F-16 aircraft.

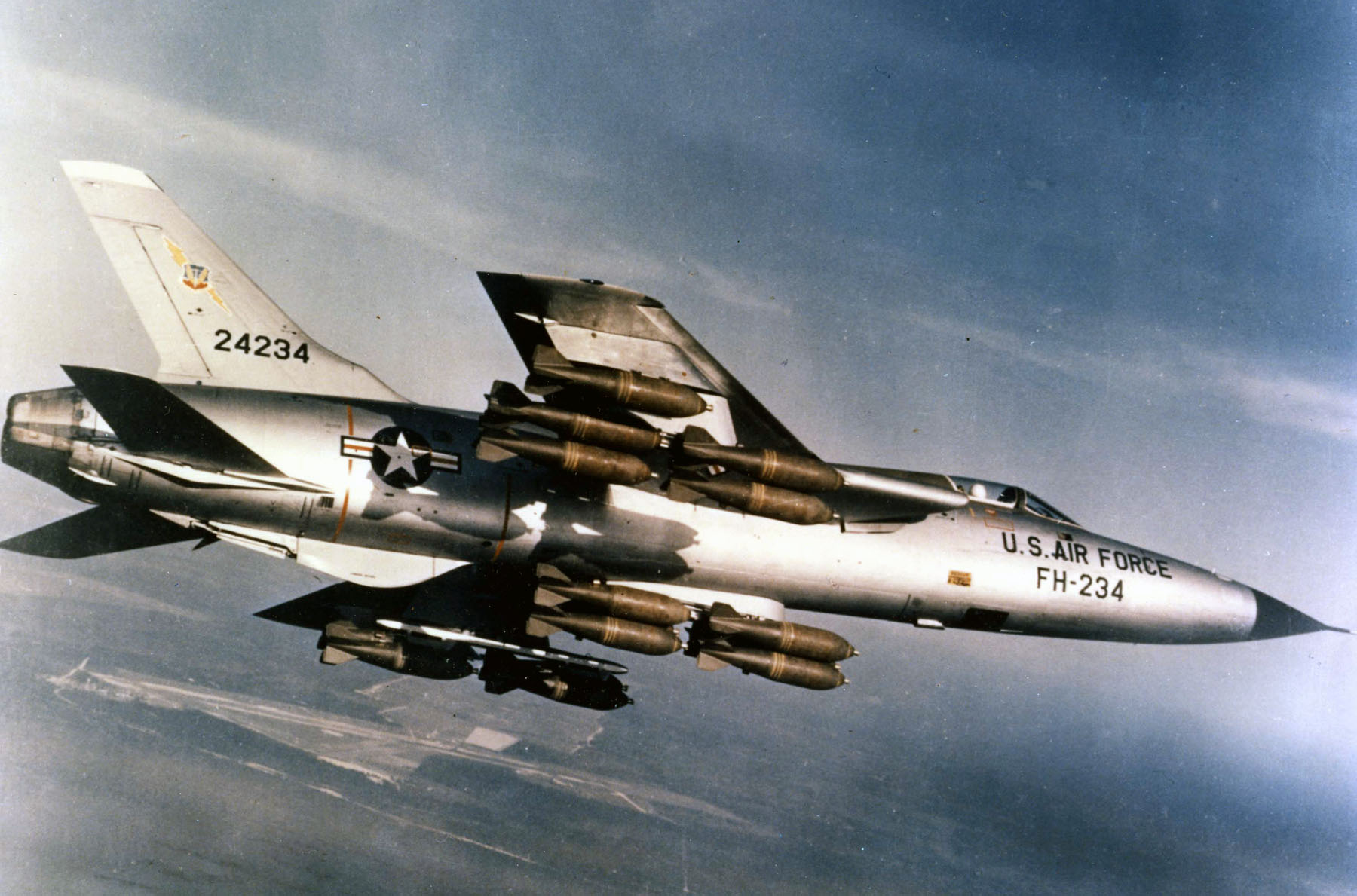
F-105D Thunderchief with a full load of sixteen 750 lb (340 kg) bombs on its five hardpoints, similar to the one in which Ralph Browning was shot down.

=== Assignments ===
- 3 June 1964, upon graduation from the academy, Browning received his commission to 2nd lieutenant and was assigned to the 3575th Pilot Training Wing, Vance Air Force Base, Enid, Oklahoma, for Undergraduate Pilot Training (UPT).
- September 1965, he received his wings.
- He completed F-105 Thunderchief Combat Crew Training at Nellis Air Force Base, Nevada
- May 1966, Browning was assigned as an F-105 pilot with the 333d Tactical Fighter Squadron, Takhli Royal Thai Air Force Base, Thailand.
- 8 July 1966, in the late afternoon, his F-105 took a direct hit from 85 mm anti-aircraft fire, burst into flames, went out of control, and he ejected while on a combat mission in F105D, tail number 0158, over North Vietnam (Loss Coordinates: 21°37′00″N 105°49′00″E) and was taken prisoner of war.
- 12 February 1973, he was released during Operation Homecoming. He was a prisoner of war in captivity for 2,412 days, over 6 1/2 years.
- 17 February 1973, following his release as a POW, Captain Browning was briefly hospitalized to recover from his injuries at Maxwell Air Force Base, Alabama.
- 2 March 1973, returned home to Orlando, and attended Rollins College, Winter Park, Florida.
- October 1973, Browning completed recurrency training with the 560th Flying Training Squadron at Randolph Air Force Base, Texas.
- January 1974, he returned to Nellis AFB to serve as a T-38 Talon pilot, instructor pilot, flight commander and assistant operations officer with the 64th Fighter Weapons Squadron and then an F-5 pilot with the 65th Fighter Weapons Squadron, known as "the Aggressors".
- December 1975, he became T-38 flight commander and assistant operations officer with the 65th Tactical Fighter Training Squadron at Nellis.
- January 1977, Maj Browning attended Armed Forces Staff College at Norfolk, Virginia.
- July 1977, he transferred to Luke Air Force Base, Arizona, serving as F-15 academics chief and assistant operations officer, 58th Tactical Training Squadron.
- June 1978, he was transferred to the 555th Tactical Fighter Training Squadron still at Luke AFB, assigned first as an F-15 pilot, operations officer (October 1978), and then squadron commander (April 1979).
- June 1981, he attended the United States Army War College at Carlisle Barracks, Pennsylvania.
- June 1982, after graduating from Army War College, now Colonel Browning was assigned as chief of the Operations Division, Directorate of Electronic Combat, Headquarters United States Air Force, Pentagon, Washington, D.C.
- July 1984, he returned to Luke AFB as vice commander of the 58th Tactical Training Wing
- September 1985, Browning assumed command of the 58th Tactical Training Wing at Luke.
- July 1987, Browning was assigned as deputy chief of staff for operations, 12th Air Force, Bergstrom Air Force Base, Texas.
- July to August 1988, he served as vice commander of 12th Air Force and U.S. Southern Air Forces (AFSOUTH).
- August 1988 to August 1990 he was commander of the 313th Air Division, Pacific Air Forces, Kadena Air Base, Japan.
- 1 October 1988, Colonel Browning was promoted to brigadier general.
- September 1990, Gen Browning returned to Luke AFB as commander of the 832d Air Division.
- October 1991, he assumed command of 58th Fighter Wing at Luke AFB, after an Air Force-initiated reorganization inactivated the air division and one of its tactical training wings, returning Luke to a one-wing base.
- 30 September 1992, Brigadier General Ralph T. "Tom" Browning retired.

About his captivity, Captain Browning said:

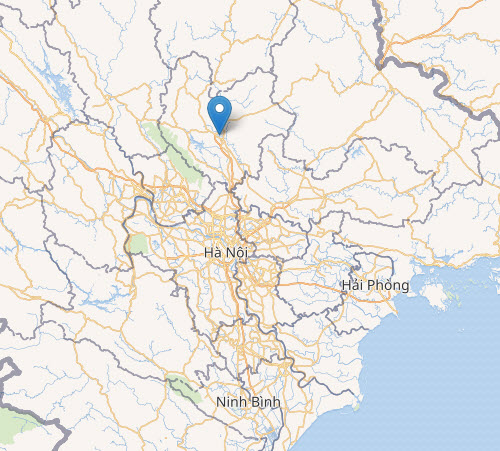
Location of Lt Ralph T Browning's crash site in N Vietnam late afternoon of 8 July 1966.

What sustained me? Faith. Faith in God; faith in the government and people of the United States; faith in my wife and family; and faith in my fellow POWs. During my captivity I was at times as depressed and dejected as I feel a human being can be. It was a profound faith in God and belief that He would see me through that helped raise me from these depths of despondency and helped sustain me through the years. Although imprisoned for six and a half years, there was never any doubt that someday I would be going home. There was never a doubt that the United States of America, from the President, himself, through the vast majority of American citizens, would never let us down and would do everything in their power to insure that we came home under honorable conditions. It would be impossible to explain to the uninitiated how unshakable bonds of friendship can be built through dismal walls without so much as a handshake or fleeting glimpse. But this was a fact in many cases. I was prepared to take my lumps for the sake of my fellows and what we believed and they would do the same for me; and we did. This faith was knowledge and from this knowledge I derived strength.

=== Awards and decorations ===
Brigadier General Ralph T. Browning's military awards and decorations include:

Decorations	Badges
Air Force Distinguished Service Medal
Silver Star	Air Force Command Pilot Badge
Legion of Merit with 2 OLC	Air Force Command Pilot Badge
Distinguished Flying Cross	Air Force Command Pilot Badge
Bronze Star Medal with "V" device and 2 OLC	Air Force Command Pilot Badge
Purple Heart	Air Force Command Pilot Badge
Meritorious Service Medal with OLC	Air Force Command Pilot Badge
Air Medal	Air Force Command Pilot Badge
Air Force Commendation Medal	Air Force Command Pilot Badge
Presidential Unit Citation with 2 OLC	Air Force Command Pilot Badge
Air Force Outstanding Unit Award with "V" device and 5 OLC	Air Force Command Pilot Badge
National Defense Service Medal	Air Force Command Pilot Badge
Vietnam Service Medal with 8 service stars	Air Force Command Pilot Badge
Republic of Vietnam Gallantry Cross with Palm	Air Force Command Pilot Badge
Republic of Vietnam Campaign Medal	Air Force Command Pilot Badge
Prisoner of War Medal	Air Force Command Pilot Badge

His Silver Star citation reads:

For gallantry and intrepidity in action in connection with military operations against an opposing armed force during the period from July 8, 1966, to July 20, 1966, while a Prisoner of War in North Vietnam. Ignoring international agreements on treatment of prisoners of war, the enemy resorted to mental and physical cruelties to obtain information, confessions, and propaganda materials. Captain Browning resisted their demands by calling upon his deepest inner strengths in a manner which reflected his devotion to duty and great credit upon himself and the United States Air Force.

== Personal life and retirement ==
While in captivity, his wife, Ann, delivered their son, Scott.

Shortly after retirement from the USAF, in 1993, R. Thomas Browning became the first CEO of Greater Phoenix Leadership, Inc., a business organization supporting community improvement efforts in the areas of transportation, education and economic development. He led GPL until 2007.

Browning also served on the boards of Neighborhood Partners Inc., Arizona Partnership for Higher Education and Business, Fighter Country Partnership, Science Foundation Arizona, Embry–Riddle Aeronautical University, Arizona State University's "Technopolis" program (a program to increase life-sciences- and technology-based entrepreneurial activity), and the VA Veteran's Medical Leadership Council.

Browning was a past chair of Big Brothers Big Sisters of Central Arizona, and past director of Valley of the Sun United Way. He was a member of the Arizona Governor's Military Affairs Commission, and Council on Workforce Policy. He was a member of the Aerospace Foundation, Air Force Association, Order of Daedalians, Valley Leadership, and Arizona Town Hall.

Browning was decorated with the Order of the Rising Sun by the Emperor of Japan, and received the Congressional Medal Of Honor Society's Distinguished Citizen Award in 2005.

In his free time, Browning enjoyed spending time with his wife and three sons, playing golf and woodworking. He died early Saturday, 7 July 2018, at the age of 76 at his home in Scottsdale, Arizona. He was survived by his wife of 35 years, Julie, his 3 sons, Scott, Aaron, and Brad, as well as four grandchildren. A memorial service with a military fly over was held at Messinger Indian School Mortuary on Saturday, July 28 at 11:00am. He was laid to rest, with full military honors and military fly over, at Arlington National Cemetery on September 27, 2019.

== See also ==
- 832d Air Division
- List of people from Holyoke, Massachusetts
- U.S. prisoners of war during the Vietnam War
