= The Encyclopedia of New York City =

Reference book on New York City

- Hardcover, 2nd edition.
- Language: English
- Subject: New York City
- Genre: Non-fiction
- Publisher: Yale University Press
- Publication date: 1995
- Publication place: United States
- Media type: Print
- Pages: 1584 pp. (2nd edition)
- ISBN: 978-0300114652

The Encyclopedia of New York City is a reference book on New York City, New York. Edited by Columbia University history professor Kenneth T. Jackson, the book was first published in 1995 by the New-York Historical Society and Yale University Press, with a second edition published in 2010. The second edition is online and can be downloaded.

== Content ==
The encyclopedia covers the arts, architecture, demographics, education, environment, government and politics, media, popular culture, science, and transportation. It contains over 4,300 entries, including 680 illustrations, photographs, maps, charts and tables that combine statistics and public records. Entries are written by experts in their respective fields and provide bibliographic references to more in-depth sources.

== Second edition ==
The updated Encyclopedia of New York City, Second Edition was released on December 1, 2010, by Yale University Press. It contains 1,584 pages, increased from the first edition's 1,392 pages.

== Awards ==
The first edition sold more than 75,000 copies and was in the top-five best-sellers in the century-long history of Yale University Press. Among its honors are:

- Recipient of the 1995 New York Society Library Award for best book about New York City
- It was named an outstanding reference book of 1995 by the American Library Association (Booklist) and by the New York Public Library
- It received an honorable mention for the 1996 Dartmouth Medal
- It was a selection of the History Book Club and the Reader's Subscription

== See also ==
- History of New York City
- Lists of encyclopedias
