= Kenneth T. Jackson =

American historian (born 1939)

- Born: July 27, 1939 (age 87); Memphis, Tennessee
- Occupations: Urban, social, cultural historian, author, and academic
- Awards: Francis Parkman Prize; Bancroft Prize; Alexander Hamilton Medal

Academic background
- Education: Bachelor of Arts; Master of Arts; Doctor of Philosophy
- Alma mater: University of Memphis; University of Chicago

Academic work
- Institutions: Columbia University
- Notable students: Janice Min; Rohit Aggarwala; Jonathan Lemire; Suzy Shuster
- Notable works: Crabgrass Frontier; The Encyclopedia of New York City

Kenneth T. Jackson (born July 27, 1939) is a professor of urban history, social history, and cultural history who has written various books and articles including on American cities. He is the Jacques Barzun Professor Emeritus of History at Columbia University, where he has also chaired the Department of History.

Jackson has lectured at colleges, universities, civic groups, and historical societies. He has appeared on NBC Today Show, ABC World News Tonight, ABC Nightline, CBS Evening News, CBS Up to the Minute, CNN, History Channel, East West Television, and documentary productions.

A former vestryman at Trinity Church on Wall Street in Manhattan (1997–2004), Jackson holds memberships in Phi Beta Kappa, the Century Association, the Society of American Historians, the New York Academy of History, the American Antiquarian Society, and the American Academy of Arts and Sciences. He served as a trustee for organizations, including the Regional Plan Association (2002–2022), the Society of American Historians (1970–2004), and the Columbia University Seminars (1985–2022), as well as the New York Historical Society since 1996, the Henry Luce Foundation since 2002, and the Prague Institute for Global Urban Development since 2008. Moreover, he was a former trustee of the New York State Historical Association, New Castle Historical Society, South Street Seaport Museum, Skyscraper Museum, Organization of American Historians, Urban History Association, and Transportation Alternatives. His contributions also include serving as a steward of the New York State Archives Partnership Trust and the Historic House Trust in New York City for many years.

1993, Jackson was featured in Playboy magazine as one of the nation's most popular professors. He received fellowships from the National Endowment for the Humanities, American Council of Learned Societies, John Simon Guggenheim Memorial Foundation, and Century Foundation, and has also been awarded five honorary doctorates from the City University of New York, St. Peter's University, State University of New York, University of the South, and Wagner College.

== Education and career ==
Jackson, a graduate of the University of Memphis (B.A., 1961) and the University of Chicago (M.A., 1963; Ph.D., 1966), served three years in the United States Air Force, before joining Columbia as an assistant professor in 1968. At Columbia, he taught courses in urban, social, and military history, advancing to associate professor in 1971, professor in 1976, and Andrew W. Mellon Professor in 1987. He assumed the Barzun Professorship in 1990. In 1989, he was honored as Teacher of the Year by college students, receiving their 28th annual Mark Van Doren Award for "humanity, devotion to truth, and inspiring leadership". Columbia President George Rupp appointed him Co-Chairman of the University's 250th-anniversary commemoration in 1996. He received the annual Great Teacher Award from the Society of Columbia Graduates in 1999 and was honored as New York State Scholar of the Year by the New York Council in 2001. In November 2016, President Lee Bollinger granted him Columbia University's highest honor, the Alexander Hamilton Medal, during a black-tie dinner in Low Memorial Library. He retired from Columbia in 2020. Furthermore, he has served as a Fulbright Lecturer in Germany, Australia, and Japan, and as a visiting professor at Princeton, UCLA, and the George Washington University.

An advocate of history as the core of social studies, Jackson chaired the Bradley Commission on History in Schools from 1987 to 1990, aiming to enhance history teaching in America's elementary and secondary institutions. Subsequently, he founded and served as the inaugural chairman of the National Council for History Education, an organization with a similar mission. Additionally, he directed seven National Endowment for the Humanities Summer Seminars for high school or college instructors and ten intensive summer programs for the Gilder-Lehrman Institute for American History. He also served on the New York State Social Studies Syllabus Review Committee in 1990 and the National Council for History Standards between 1992 and 1996. Alongside these roles, he served as the president of the Urban History Association (1994-1995), the Society of American Historians (1998-2000), the Organization of American Historians (2000-2001), the New York Historical Society (2001-2004), and the New York Academy of History (2014-2023).

== Publications and contributions ==
Jackson was the general editor of the Columbia History of Urban Life, twenty volumes of which had appeared by 2020. From 1990 to 1996, he held the position of editor-in-chief for the Dictionary of American Biography, followed by The Scribner Encyclopedia of American Lives from 1996 to 2005. Collaborating with Camilo J. Vergara, he co-authored Silent Cities: The Evolution of the American Cemetery (Princeton Architectural Press, 1989). Among his books are the revised edition of the Atlas of American History (Scribner’s, 1978), and Cities in American History (with Stanley K. Schultz: Alfred A. Knopf, 1972). Working alongside Leonard Dinnerstein, he produced seven editions of American Vistas from 1970 to 1998, and co-authored Empire City: New York Through the Centuries (Columbia, 2002) with David Dunbar. His publication Crabgrass Frontier: The Suburbanization of the United States (Oxford, 1985) earned recognition from the History Book Club and was featured in special sessions at prominent historical conventions. It received prestigious accolades including the Francis Parkman and Bancroft Prizes, and was listed among the New York Times notable books of the year.

In collaboration with Vergara, Jackson organized two public exhibitions. The first, titled Transformed Houses, was a project of the Smithsonian Institution focusing on domestic architecture in working-class neighborhoods. The second, sponsored by the Municipal Art Society in Manhattan, addressed physical devastation in ghetto areas.

Jackson served as the editor-in-chief of the Encyclopedia of New York City, initially released in 1995 by Yale University Press. The encyclopedia, initially published in a single, 1373-page volume, underwent seven reprints and garnered recognition for its excellence in reference. The second edition, published in 2010, included over five thousand individual entries on various topics including neighborhoods, ethnic groups, schools, religious denominations, and media outlets. It was praised by the New York Times as indispensable for anyone interested in the city.

== Awards and honors ==
- Donald Sullivan Award, Hunter College
- Distinguished Alumni Award, University of Memphis
- Gold Medal of Merit, St. Nicholas Society
- Notable New Yorker Award, Skyscraper Museum
- Delbarton Medal, Delbarton School
- Tannenbaum-Warner Award, The University Seminars
- Pintard-Benson Centennial Medal, New-York Historical Society
- Nicholas Murray Butler Medal, Columbia University
- Liberty Medal, New York Post
- Gold Medal, National Institute of Social Sciences

== Personal life ==
Jackson lives in New York City and Mount Kisco. He married his wife, Barbara Bruce Jackson (1939–2025) in 1962. She retired as chair of the English department at Blind Brook High School in Rye Brook, New York in 2001.

== Bibliography ==
=== Books ===
- The Ku Klux Klan in the City, 1915–1930. The Urban Life in America Series. Oxford University Press. 1967 – via Internet Archive. LCCN 67-28129, OCLC 164461230 (all editions)
- Cities in American History (1972) ISBN 978-0394311470
- Atlas of American History (1980) ISBN 978-0684150529
- Crabgrass Frontier: The Suburbanization of the United States (1985) ISBN 978-0195036107
- Silent Cities: The Evolution of the American Cemetery (1989) ISBN 978-0910413220
- Dictionary of American Biography Volume 9 (1994) ISBN 978-0684193984
- American Vistas (1995) ISBN 978-0195087833
- The Neighborhoods of Brooklyn (1998) ISBN 978-0300077520
- The Scribner Encyclopedia of American Lives (1998) ISBN 978-0684804927
- Empire City: New York Through the Centuries (2002) ISBN 978-0231109086
- Robert Moses and the Modern City: The Transformation of New York (2007) ISBN 978-0393732061
- The Almanac of New York City (2008) ISBN 978-0231140638
- The Encyclopedia of New York City (2010) ISBN 978-0300114652

=== Selected articles ===
- Jackson, K. T. (1996). All the world's a mall: Reflections on the social and economic consequences of the American shopping center. The American Historical Review, 101(4), 1111-1121.
- Jackson, K. T. (2000). Gentleman’s agreement: discrimination in metropolitan America. Reflections on regionalism, 185-217.
- Jackson, K. T. (2005). The Road to Hell: The United States, Japan, and the Evolution of National Patterns of Transport and Suburban Housing. In Proceedings of the Kyoto American Studies Summer Seminar, 93-110.
- Jackson, K. T. (2007). Asher B. Durand’s New York: The Life of the City in the Nineteenth Century. Kindred Spirits: Asher B. Durand and the American Landscape.
- Jackson, K. T. (2008). Robert Moses and the rise of New York The power broker in perspective. Robert Moses and the modern city: the transformation of New York.
