= Washington: Village and Capital, 1800–1878 =

1962 book by Constance McLaughlin Green

- Author: Constance McLaughlin Green
- Language: English
- Subject: Washington, DC
- Publication date: 1962
- Publication place: United States
- Awards: Pulitzer Prize for History
- Followed by: Washington: Capital City, 1879–1950

Washington: Village and Capital, 1800–1878 (1962) is first volume of a two-volume Pulitzer Prize–winning work by American historian Constance McLaughlin Green, tracing the development of Washington, DC, from 1800 to 1878. Green won the 1963 Pulitzer Prize for History for it. Donald H. Mugridge of the Historical Society of Washington, D.C., called the work "the first volume of what is self-evidently the most important general history of the City of Washington, and I have no hesitation in saying the most important contribution to the knowledge of its history, in nearly half a century."

Green's second volume was published in 1963, titled Washington: Capital City, 1879–1950, tracing its development from 1879 to 1950.
