= Municipal annexation in the United States =

Process of a municipality acquiring new territory

Administrative divisions of Wisconsin

Municipal annexation is a process by which a municipality acquires new territory, most commonly by expanding its boundaries into an adjacent unincorporated area. This has been a common response of cities to urbanization in neighboring areas. It may be done because the neighboring urban areas seek municipal services or because a city seeks control over its suburbs or neighboring unincorporated areas.

In the United States, all local governments are considered "creatures of the state" according to Dillon's Rule, which resulted from the work of John Forrest Dillon on the law of municipal corporations. Dillon's Rule implies, among other things, that the boundaries of any jurisdiction falling under state government can be modified by state government action. For this reason, examples of municipal annexation are distinct from annexations involving sovereign states.

== Shoestring annexation ==
A map of Los Angeles County with the city of Los Angeles in red, showing the Shoestring Strip annexation, which reaches south to the San Pedro area and the Port of Los Angeles.

A "shoestring annexation" is a term used for an annexation by a city, town or other municipality in which it acquires new territory that is contiguous to the existing territory but is only connected to it by a thin strip of land. It is sometimes called a "flagpole annexation" because the territory resembles a flagpole, in which the connection is the "pole" and the annexed territory the "flag".

=== Reasons ===
In some states, municipalities are prohibited from annexing land not directly connected to their existing territory. A shoestring or flagpole annexation allows the municipality to do so.

Such annexations are sometimes used when a municipality seeks to acquire unincorporated developed land, such as a newly built subdivision separated from it by undeveloped open space. They may also be used when a municipality desires to annex a commercial or industrial area without taking over intervening residential areas, so as to collect tax revenues from the businesses or industry without having to provide services (such as electricity and garbage collection) to residents. Such uses of the technique are often criticized and derided as a form of gerrymandering, and have in fact been used for the purpose of manipulating vote distribution among election precincts and districts.

A related strategy is called strip annexation, which involves annexing a narrow strip that encloses a large block of unincorporated land. Strip annexation was widely used by the municipalities of the Phoenix metropolitan area during the 1970s to preemptively gain control of large areas of land before other municipalities, without having to annex more than a thin strip surrounding a large so-called county island. The strip protected the county island from being annexed by other municipalities, thus giving the strip-annexing municipality the ability to slowly annex portions of the county island over time. One such annexation by Chandler in 1974 spurred nearby Gilbert to create the largest county island to date by annexing a strip no more than 200 feet wide that enclosed 51 square miles of unincorporated Maricopa County. The annexation was challenged in court and, although found legal, eventually led to legislation in 1980 outlawing strip annexation. Some municipalities rushed to annex before the law took effect, such as Scottsdale, which annexed a 10 foot wide strip enclosing an 86 square mile county island.

Some municipalities, such as Houston, rely on annexation to prop up their municipal budgets. By annexing land which seems likely to be developed, the city can collect development charges (impact fees and other taxes) which can be used to pay for infrastructure maintenance (such as roads, bridges, parks, water and sewage pipes) in other areas which developed decades prior and which do not generate enough tax revenue to pay for the long-term maintenance of the infrastructure on which they now rely.

This has been likened to a Ponzi scheme by critics, who point out that this growth cannot continue forever: eventually, either the municipality will become completely boxed in by other established municipalities which have the political will and influence to resist annexation, or the unincorporated land which can be annexed isn't very attractive to developers due to lengthy commute times, adverse environmental and geographical conditions (such as being in floodplains, swamplands, or mountains), or a lack of demand. When this occurs, cities must either raise taxes to pay for infrastructure maintenance, cut other city services to prioritize maintenance, or defer maintenance at the cost of letting the infrastructure deteriorate. Cities can also rely on wealth redistributions from state and federal governments, at the cost of making their municipal budgets far more volatile as these tend to be one-time or time-limited grants.

Suburban developments are disproportionately impacted by this, as their lower population densities and increased demands by residents for city-like services prevent them from achieving the same economies of scale which allow for lower per-capita maintenance costs in urban environments, but major cities can also become encumbered by annexed suburban developments or annexing land which will become suburban sprawl due to the aforementioned lack of density and subsequent tax revenues.

=== Examples ===
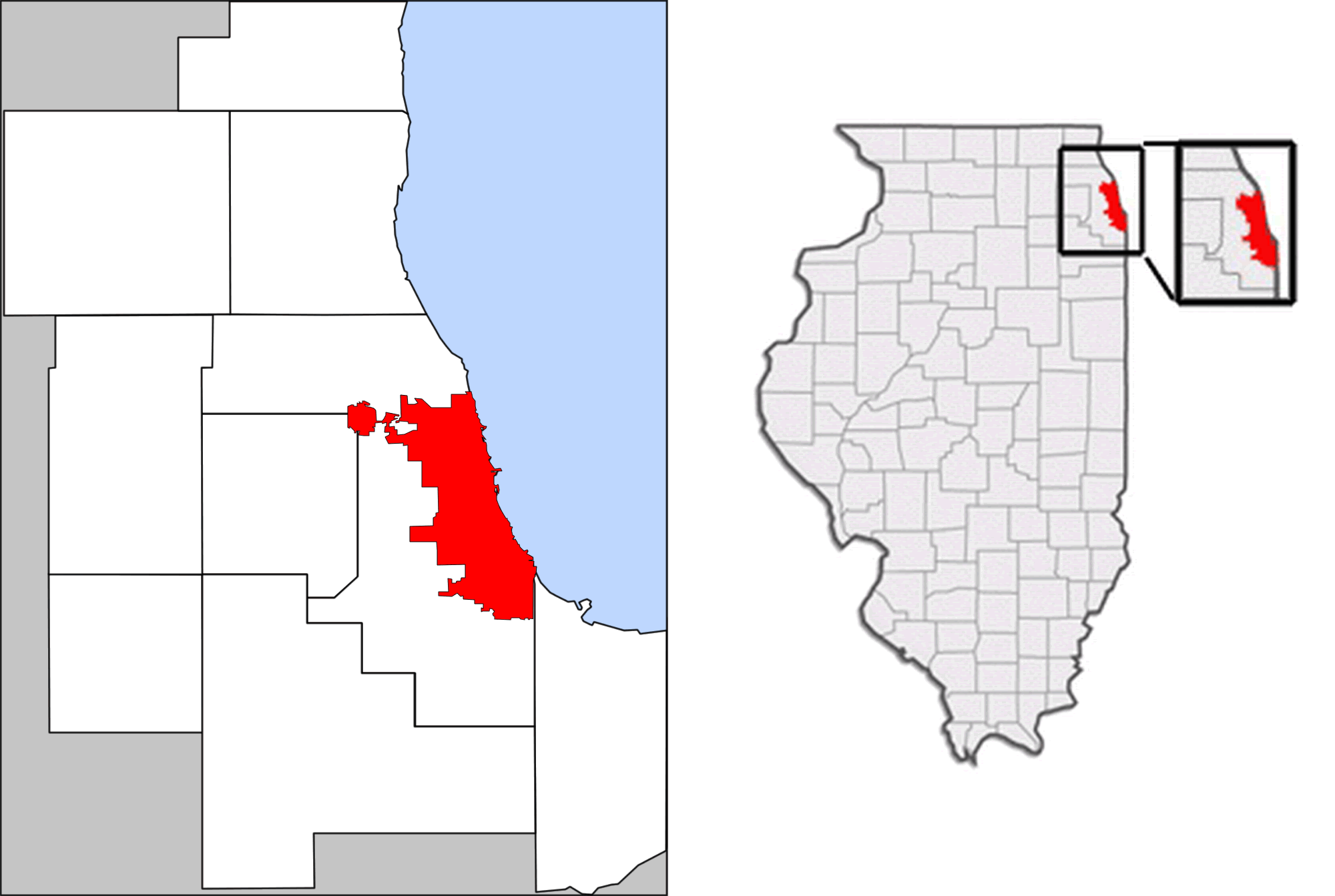
A map of the city of Chicago showing the connection into DuPage County for O'Hare International Airport.

==== Port of Los Angeles ====
The Port of Los Angeles together with the San Pedro, Wilmington and Harbor City neighborhoods of Los Angeles, are connected to the main part of the city by what is called locally the "Shoestring Strip" between Figueroa Street and Vermont Avenue and between Western and Normandie avenues to the south.

==== O'Hare Airport ====
O'Hare Airport is municipally connected to the city of Chicago via a narrow strip of land, approximately 200 feet wide, along Foster Avenue from the Des Plaines River to the airport. This land was annexed in the 1950s to assure the airport was contiguous with the city to keep it under city control. The strip is bounded on the north by Rosemont and the south by Schiller Park.

==== Allston-Brighton ====
The Boston neighborhoods of Allston and Brighton were part of an independent town of Brighton before being annexed by Boston. They are presently connected to the remainder of the city by the Boston University campus. At the time of the annexation, Brookline extended to the Charles River and separated Boston and Brighton. As a result, a shoestring annexation was obtained by Boston from Brookline when Brighton joined Boston. This was made necessary by Brookline's refusal to join Boston a year before Brighton's annexation.

==== Santa Barbara Municipal Airport ====
Santa Barbara Municipal Airport is connected to the city of Santa Barbara, despite being located in the center of the city of Goleta, through 300 feet wide strip of land mostly located under the Pacific Ocean.

==== South San Diego ====
South San Diego, located next to the Mexico–United States border, is physically separated from the rest of San Diego by the cities of National City and Chula Vista. A narrow strip of land at the bottom of San Diego Bay connects these southern neighborhoods with the rest of the city.

==== West Grove ====
West Grove, the western portion of the city of Garden Grove in Orange County, California, is separated from the rest of the city by the city of Stanton. The two portions of the city are connected to the rest of the city by a narrow strip of land along Garden Grove Boulevard from Beach Boulevard to Hoover Street.

== See also ==
- Municipal annexation
- Municipal deannexation in the United States
- Amalgamation (politics)
- Enclave and exclave
- Boroughitis
- Paper township
