= Lois Green Carr =

American historian

- Born: Lois Green; March 7, 1922; Holyoke, Massachusetts
- Died: June 28, 2015 (aged 93); Annapolis, Maryland
- Occupation: Historian

Lois Green Carr (7 March 1922 – 28 June 2015) was an American historian of Colonial Maryland and the European settlement of the Chesapeake Bay, serving as the principal historian of St. Mary's City, Maryland for over four decades.

== Biography ==
Carr was born in Holyoke, Massachusetts on March 7, 1922, the daughter of Pulitzer Prize-winning historian Constance McLaughlin Green. She attended The Putney School in Putney, Vermont and earned a bachelor's degree from Swarthmore College. She earned a master's degree from Radcliffe College and a Ph.D. in history from Harvard University.

Twenty-four years elapsed between Carr's master's degree and her Ph.D., because she left Harvard in 1947 after getting married and moving to New York. She later moved to Maryland, divorced and remarried, and started a new thesis on Maryland history, finishing her doctorate in 1968. She had one son from her first marriage, Andrew R. Clark.

Carr started as a junior archivist in 1956 at the Maryland State Archives in Annapolis, becoming a senior adjunct scholar in 1988. She became the historian for Historic St. Mary's City in 1967, founding a research program seeking to document the lives of every known 17th-century St. Mary's resident. She was president of the Economic History Association in 1990–91.

Carr was an adjunct professor of history at the University of Maryland, College Park from 1982 to 2005. She was a pioneer in the field of colonial history, designing and directing several long-term team history research projects that won support from the National Science Foundation and the National Endowment for the Humanities. In 1992, the a conference was organized at the University of Maryland in her honor, Lois Green Carr: The Chesapeake and Beyond - A Celebration.

Carr was a co-author of Robert Cole's World: Agriculture and Society in Early Maryland, which won the Alice Hanson Jones Prize from the Economic History Association in 1992 and the Maryland Historical Society Book prize in 1993. She was one of the 1996 recipients of the Eisenberg Prize for Excellence in the Humanities. In 2000 she was named to the Maryland Women's Hall of Fame.

Carr died of dementia complications in Annapolis, Maryland on June 28, 2015.

== Publications ==
- Carr, Lois Green; Menard, Russell R.; Walsh, Lorena Seebach (1991). Robert Cole's World: Agriculture and Society in Early Maryland. University of North Carolina Press. ISBN 9780807843413.
- Carr, Lois Green (1988). Colonial Chesapeake Society. Institute of Early American History and Culture, Williamsburg, Virginia. ISBN 9780807818008.
- Papenfuse, Edward C.; Stiverson, Gregory A.; Collins, Susan A.; Carr, Lois Green (1976). Maryland: a new guide to the Old Line State. Johns Hopkins University Press. ISBN 9780801818745.
- Carr, Lois Green; Jordan, David William (1974). Maryland's Revolution of Government, 1689-1692. Cornell University Press. ISBN 9780801407932.
