= Eric Toensmeier =

Climate change author

- Occupation: Author
- Writing career
- Subjects: Climate change, Biodiversity, and Nutrition
- Website: www.perennialsolutions.org

Eric Toensmeier is an author of several books focused on climate change, biodiversity, and nutrition. He is also a lecturer at Yale University and a Senior Biosequestration Fellow at Project Drawdown.

Previously, he managed a farm program for Nuestras Raices, a nonprofit organization that ran community gardens in Holyoke, Massachusetts; and ran a mail-order seed company with Jonathan Bates for plants that would improve the soil or attract beneficial insects.

== Career ==
Toensmeier's works include Paradise Lot, Perennial Vegetables: From Artichoke to 'Zuiki' Taro, a Gardener's Guide to Over 100 Delicious, Easy-to-Grow Edibles, Edible Forests Gardens: Ecological Vision and Theory for Temperate Climate Permaculture (co-authored), and Perennial Vegetables: A neglected resource for biodiversity, carbon sequestration, and nutrition (co-authored).

In Perennial Vegetables: A neglected resource, Toensmeier provides information on crops that could help address malnutrition issues, including trees with edible, nutritious leaves. Perennial plants are those that grow all-year-round and do not require replanting or reseeding. They are used in regenerative and sustainable farming.

In February 2020, Toensmeier's 2016 book, Carbon Farming: A Global Toolkit for Stabilizing the Climate with Tree Crops and Regenerative Agriculture Practices, was released as an ebook. In the book, Toensmeier argues that carbon farming has the potential to return carbon dioxide in the atmosphere to 350 parts per million, while also providing food for people and regenerating soil. Carbon farming is defined as the use of agriculture to remove excess carbon from the air and soil by storing it in trees and plants. Toensmeier practices carbon farming at his home in Holyoke, Massachusetts.

Toensmeier is an adviser for Summersweet Gardens Nursery at Perennial Pleasures, whose owner was inspired by Toensmeier's book, Perennial Vegetables.

More recently, Toensmeier became a senior fellow at the climate think tank, Project Drawdown, as well as lecturing at Yale.

== Publications ==
- Paradise Lot
- Perennial Vegetables: From Artichoke to 'Zuiki' Taro, a Gardener's Guide to Over 100 Delicious, Easy-to-Grow Edibles
- Edible Forests Gardens: Ecological Vision and Theory for Temperate Climate Permaculture (co-authored)
- Perennial Vegetables: A neglected resource for biodiversity, carbon sequestration, and nutrition (co-authored)
- Carbon Farming: A Global Toolkit for Stabilizing the Climate with Tree Crops and Regenerative Agriculture Practices

== See also ==
- The Carbon Farming Solution
