= Theodore J. Wojnar =

U.S. Coast Guard rear admiral (1930–2024)

- Born: October 21, 1930; Holyoke, Massachusetts, U.S.
- Died: October 17, 2024 (aged 93)
- Military career
- Allegiance: United States of America
- Branch: United States Coast Guard
- Service years: 1953–1988
- Rank: Rear Admiral
- Units: USCGC Eastwind (WAGB-279), USCGC Chincoteague (WAVP-375)
- Commands: Coast Guard District 13, US Fleet Yokosuka
- Awards: Legion of Merit, Coast Guard Achievement Medal, Arctic Service Medal

Theodore Joseph Wojnar (October 21, 1930 – October 17, 2024) was a Rear Admiral in the United States Coast Guard.

== Background ==
Wojnar was a native of Holyoke, Massachusetts. He attended the University of Massachusetts Amherst and Rensselaer Polytechnic Institute.

Wojnar died at home on October 17, 2024, at the age of 93.

== Career ==
Wojnar graduated from the United States Coast Guard Academy in 1953. He was then assigned to the USCGC Eastwind (WAGB-279) and served with the International Ice Patrol.

After serving aboard the USCGC Chincoteague (WAVP-375), Wojnar was stationed in Milwaukee, Wisconsin and Honolulu, Hawaii. Later, he was given overseas assignments in Yokosuka, Japan and London, England and at Réunion, France.

Wojnar's additional assignments include serving as Chief of the Civil Engineering Division of the Coast Guard before assuming command of Coast Guard District 13 in 1986.

During his career, Wojnar was awarded the Legion of Merit, the Meritorious Service Medal, the Coast Guard Commendation Medal, the Coast Guard Achievement Medal, the Commandant's Letter of Commendation Ribbon and the Arctic Service Medal.
