= Constance McLaughlin Green =

American historian

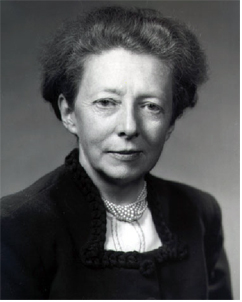
- Born: Constance Winsor McLaughlin; August 21, 1897; Ann Arbor, Michigan
- Died: December 5, 1975 (aged 78); Annapolis, Maryland
- Occupation: Historian
- Spouse: Donald Ross Green
- Children: 3

Constance Winsor Green (née McLaughlin; August 21, 1897, in Ann Arbor, Michigan – December 5, 1975, in Annapolis, Maryland), best known as Constance McLaughlin Green, was an American historian. She who won the 1963 Pulitzer Prize for History for Washington, Village and Capital, 1800–1878 (1962).

== Biography ==
Green was born at Ann Arbor, Michigan. Her father was historian Andrew C. McLaughlin. She completed a bachelor's degree at Smith College in 1919 and a Master's degree at Mount Holyoke College in history in 1925. After graduation, Green served as a part-time instructor at Mount Holyoke from 1925 to 1932. Going on to complete a PhD at Yale University in 1937, her dissertation, a case history of Holyoke, Massachusetts, represented one of the earliest academic works of urban history, and would subsequently be published by Yale University Press upon receiving the university's Eggleston Award in History.

In 1938, she became instructor in the history department of Smith College and head of the Smith College Council of Industrial Relations in 1939. After leaving Smith, Green accepted the position of historian at Springfield Armory during the Second World War. She became a consulting historian for the American Red Cross in 1946, chief historian of the Army Ordnance Department in 1948, and historian at the research and development board, Office of the Secretary of Defense. In 1954, under a six-year grant from the Rockefeller Foundation, Green became director of the Washington History Project, which was administrated by American University.

She married Donald Ross Green; they had three children, including daughter Lois Green Carr, who was also a historian.

Green died on December 5, 1975, in Annapolis, Maryland, at her daughter's home.

== Publications, prizes, and honorary degrees ==
Green wrote a number of books on the urbanization of the United States. Her works on this subject include American Cities in the Growth of the Nation (1957), The Rise of Urban America (1965), and The Secret City: A History of Race Relations in the Nation's Capital (1967).

Her other works include History of Naugatuck, Connecticut (1948), The Ordnance Department: Planning Munitions for War (1955), Eli Whitney and the Birth of American Technology (1956), Vanguard - A History (1970) co-authored with Milton Lomask for NASA, The Church on Lafayette Square: A History of St. Johns Church, Washington D.C., 1815–1970 (1970) and Washington: A History of the Capital, 1800–1950 (1976).

In 1963 she won the Pulitzer Prize for History for Washington, Village and Capital, 1800–1878. She also won the Eggleston Prize in History for Holyoke, Massachusetts: A Case History of the Industrial Revolution in America.

She received honorary degrees from Smith College and Pace College.
