= J. Lewis Wyckoff =

American businessman and golfer (1864–1931)

Joseph Lewis Wyckoff
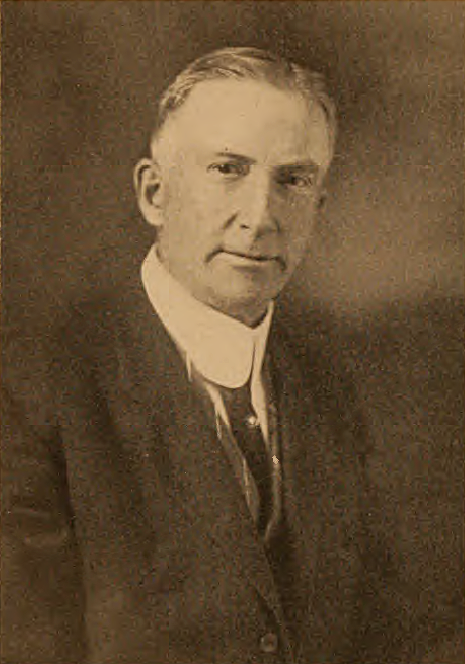
- Photo portrait of Wyckoff from American Golfer, 1916
- Born: December 10, 1864; Perry, New York
- Died: March 19, 1931 (aged 66); Holyoke, Massachusetts
- Burial place: Forestdale Cemetery
- Known for: Stationery manufacturer, golfer, golf promoter
- Spouse: Minnie Branch

J. Lewis Wyckoff (December 10, 1864 – March 19, 1931) was an American businessman, stationery manufacturer, golfer, and promoter of golf. Wyckoff was the junior partner of the White & Wyckoff Manufacturing Company, a patron and backer of golf course architect Donald Ross, and a civic activist in Holyoke, Massachusetts who was largely responsible for its 1909 annexation of the village of Smith's Ferry from Northampton, Massachusetts. He was also referred to as the "father of Mount Tom Golf Club", which today bears his name as the Wyckoff Country Club, as well as its adjacent neighborhood, known as Wyckoff Park.

In addition to serving as president of White & Wyckoff, he occupied a number of other business and civic positions by the time of his death. This included as vice president of Cowan Truck Company, a director of the Hadley Falls Trust Company, trustee of Holyoke Savings Bank, an active 32nd degree freemason of the Mount Tom and William Whiting Lodges of Holyoke, member of the Holland Society of New York, and the Alden Kindred of America.
