= Smith's Ferry, Holyoke, Massachusetts =

Smith's Ferry
- Neighborhood of Holyoke
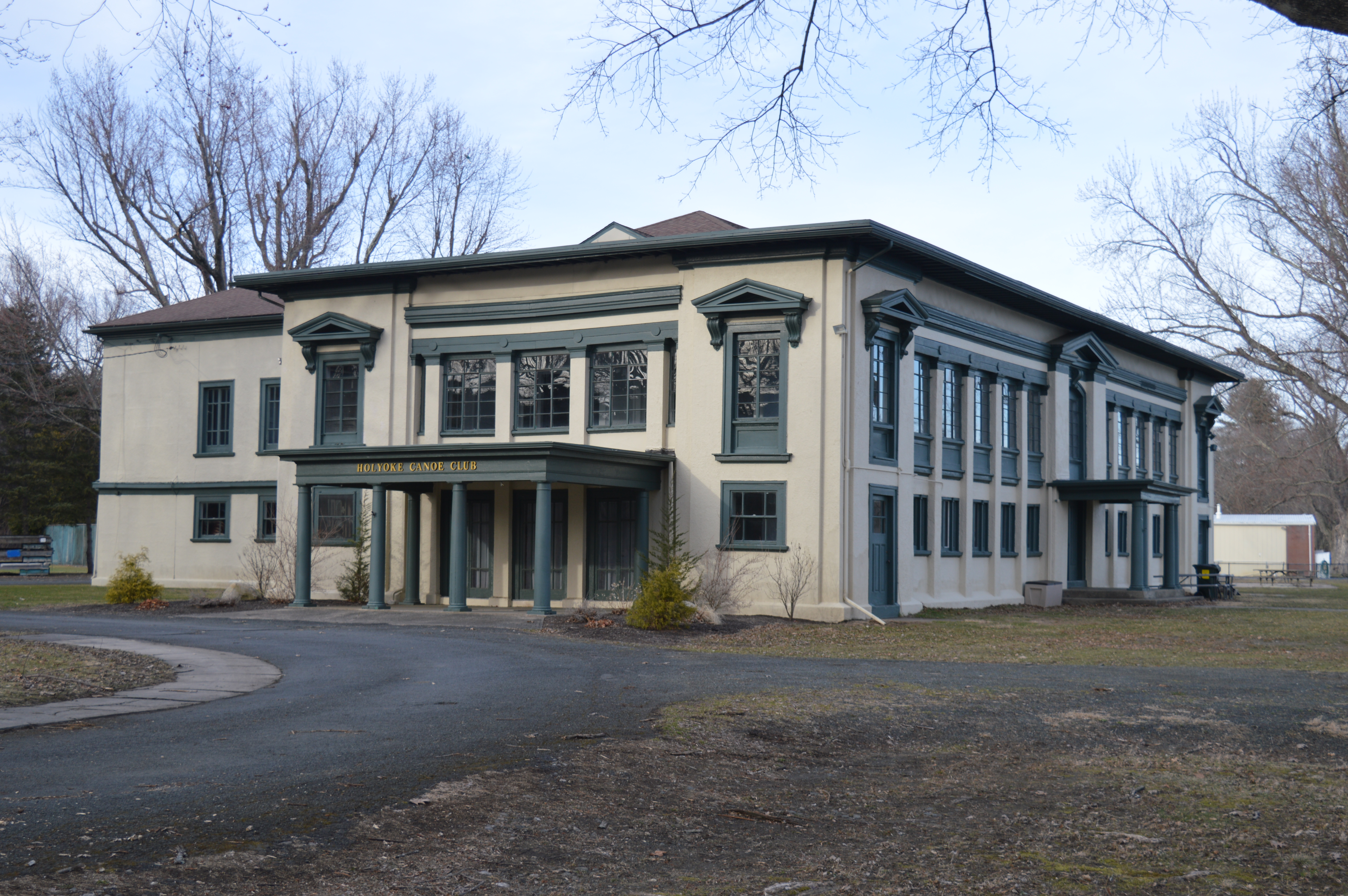
- Riverside clubhouse of the Holyoke Canoe Club, Smith's Ferry

- Location within Holyoke Location within Massachusetts Location within the United States
- Coordinates: 42°15′30.33″N 72°36′51.32″W
- Country: United States
- State: Massachusetts
- City: Holyoke
- Wards: 7
- Precincts: 7A
- Annexed: June 9, 1909

Area
  - Total: 5.94 sq mi (15.4 km^{2})
- Elevation: 128 ft (39 m)
- ZIP code: 01040
- Area code: 413
- GNIS feature ID: 609085

Smith's Ferry is a neighborhood in Holyoke, Massachusetts, United States, located to the north of the city center, approximately 1.5 miles (2.4 km) from downtown. The neighborhood prominently features the Mount Tom State Reservation, as well as the Mountain Park Amphitheater, the Dinosaur Footprints Reservation, and several other recreational and historic venues. Smith's Ferry is the second largest geographic division in Holyoke after Rock Valley, comprising roughly 3,800 acres (1,500 ha) of mixed residential, commercial, and recreational zoning.

== History ==
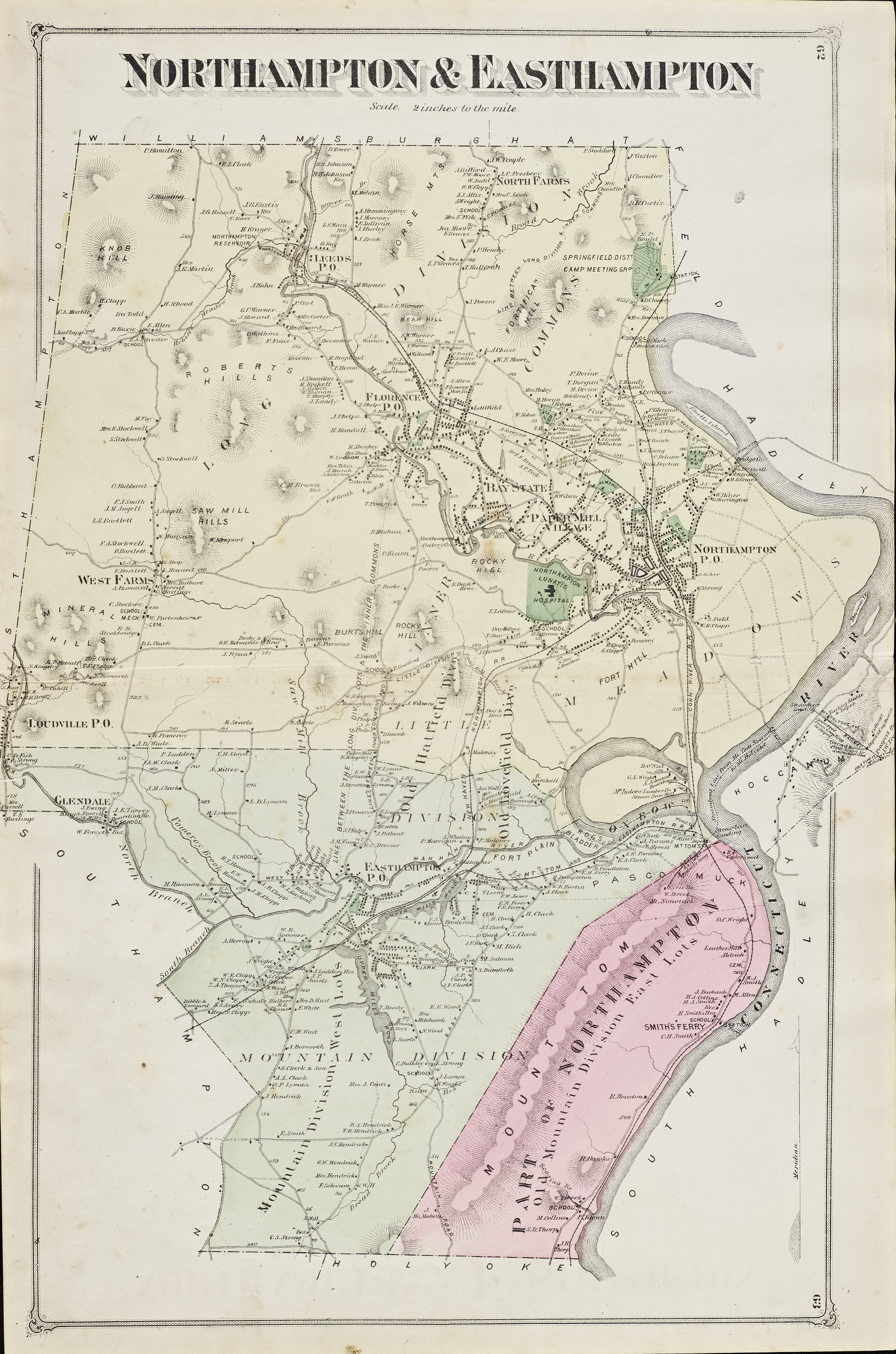
A map of Northampton and Easthampton in 1873, with the Smith's Ferry annex highlighted in red

The namesake of Smith's Ferry was one of the many ferry operators who navigated the Connecticut prior to the construction of the Joseph E. Muller Bridge and South Hadley Falls Bridge in Holyoke. The first ferry began operation in 1658, long before the establishment of the city, and others continued operating between the east and west riverbanks through the early 20th century.

By 1704, around half a dozen families lived in Smith's Ferry, often banding together at nights and "forting" in a single house to stave off attacks from the local natives. Months after the successful Raid on Deerfield during Queen Anne's War, on May 13, 1704, a number of tribesmen attacked Easthampton in the Pascommuck Massacre. Several of these men would go on to attack Smith's Ferry, crossing over the Mount Tom Range and setting fire to the homestead of Benjamin Wright. Ultimately they would be repelled by the village settlers; one native was killed during the skirmish.

Smith's Ferry remained a vestige of the original boundaries of Northampton for much of its existence, and was formerly known as the Old Mountain Division East Lots. The boundaries between it and the rest of Northampton were divided, however, by a small tract of land in Easthampton to the south of The Oxbow. While the land was officially governed by the City of Northampton, it was often the Holyoke Fire Department that had to respond to emergency calls in the area.

For these reasons the idea for annexing some of the territory was introduced to the legislature in 1908 but was opposed by the Holyoke Canoe Club and country club (now known as the Wyckoff Country Club), as it did not call for annexation of the entirety of the discontinuous territory.

The movement to annex the neighborhood gained considerable momentum when on March 21, 1909, the canoe club's property burned to the ground due to a grass fire ignited by sparks from a passing locomotive. Some boys who had seen that the grass was on fire ran to the residence of J. Lewis Wyckoff, a prominent figure in the community, and ultimately alarm was given to the Highlands fire station. The Northampton fire department received a call about the fire but was unable to respond due to the condition and distance of the roads between their fire station and the club. By the time Holyoke firefighters arrived, the building was considered a total loss; however, they were able to extinguish flames that had spread to the adjacent railroad ties and telephone poles. In return for their services, the canoe club paid the Holyoke fireman's aid association a sum of $25, which resulted in a rebuke from the city of Northampton, seen as the city overstepping its bounds. Days later a writer from the Springfield Republican would criticize how "Smiths Ferry [sic] residents are told by Northampton, on the one hand that they should be satisfied with what they are not getting, [while] Holyoke is severely censured on the other hand for offering to give them any of the conveniences of life." Ultimately the fire became a driving force in the call for annexation; weeks later, a legislative committee on cities arrived in Holyoke and toured the clubhouse ruins with Wyckoff.

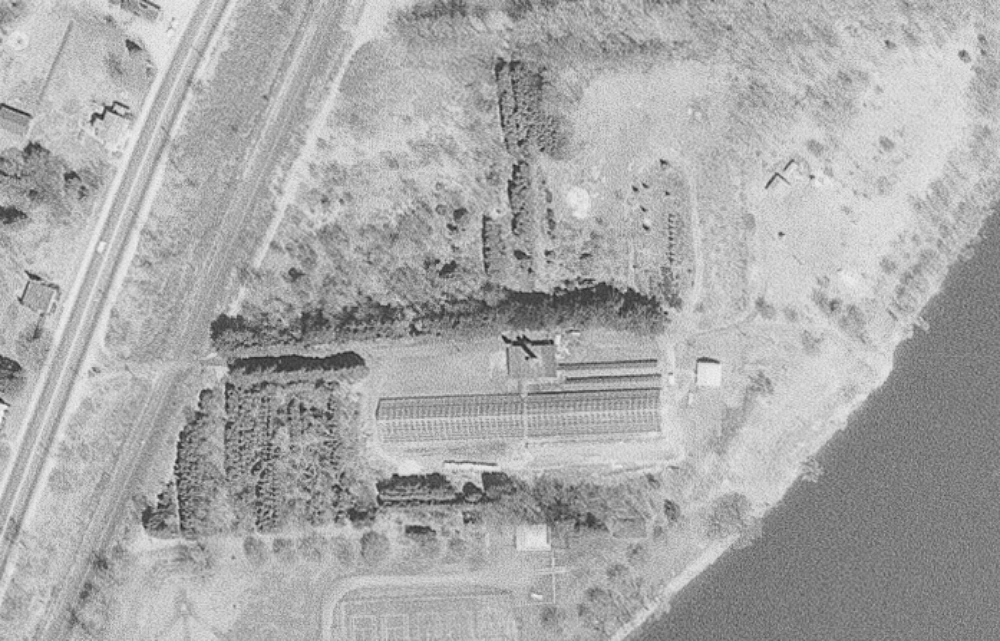
An aerial view of the Mount Tom Greenhouse, a wholesale floristry business, as seen from an aerial photograph, 1962

Frustrated by the lack of services, the residents of Smith's Ferry successfully petitioned to join Holyoke, and on June 9, 1909, the Massachusetts Legislature passed an act allowing the land to be annexed by the City of Holyoke. In return for his advocacy for the act, Wyckoff was given the key to the city. At the time of its passage, the act required the City of Holyoke pay $7,000 to the Hampshire County government to compensate for the construction of the state road in the area. The act also mandated that the City of Holyoke pay the City of Northampton a sum of $55,000 for the land, for which the City would issue bonds to repay. In total the annexation cost $62,000 at the time, the equivalent of $1.5 million in 2016 US dollars.

During the 20th century the area was home to the Mount Tom Station, the last coal power plant in Massachusetts, which closed in 2014. One of the few businesses in the largely residential neighborhood, was the Mount Tom Greenhouse company, which produced flowers for local florists from about 1950 to 1981. Today the area is still home to the Jericho, a community center for disabled children and adults operated by the Diocese of Springfield.

== Geography ==
=== Geology ===
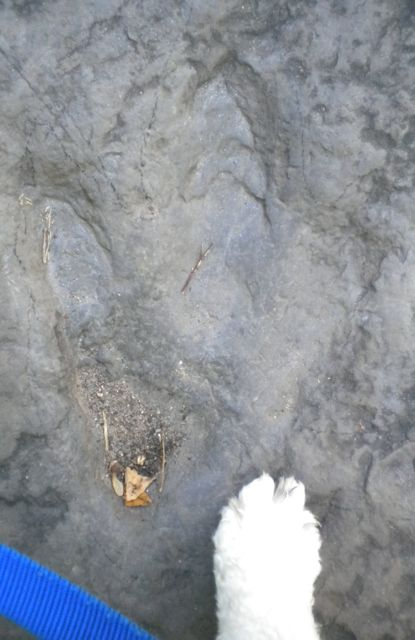
One of several dinosaur footprints visible in Smith's Ferry at the Dinosaur Footprints Reservation, with a dog's paw for scale

Smith's Ferry contains a unique mix of sedimentary and igneous rocks due to its proximity to a Mesozoic Rift Basin, where volcanic surface flows once manifested due to continental rifts that arose with the tectonic dispersal of Pangaea. Those rifts which were aborted created igneous deposits along various inland landscapes such as the Connecticut River Valley.

The area's igneous activity from the Jurassic period has left a landscape of Holyoke and black-rock diabase in and around Mt. Tom, the former being created by surface lava flow and the latter as it was forced through layers of subterranean sandstone where it became deposited as an igneous mass. Basalt also occurs in the area due to the former volcanic activity. Sedimentary rocks abut the igneous deposits with large swaths of arkosic sandstone extant along the banks of the Connecticut River. It is on this sandstone that dinosaur tracks from Early Jurassic can be found. These tracks were once so prevalent that they could be readily found by land-owners who would often chisel them away from the landscape and sell them to tourists. Construction of I-91 along Mt. Tom was briefly delayed in the mid-1960s when several slabs of dinosaurs were discovered from blasting in the area.

== Transportation ==
=== Streets and highways ===
The most prominent road in Smith's Ferry is U.S. Route 5 which traverses the entire length of the region. PVTA bus route B48 passes through this highway but does not, however, have any marked stops there. This span of highway also contains a marked bike lane separated from traffic by a painted median.

U.S. Interstate 91 largely defines the boundaries of the southeast side of Mount Tom State Reservation but is only accessible to the immediate north or south of the neighborhood via Exit 18 in Northampton and Exit 17 on MA Route 141 respectively.

=== Rail ===
The railway in Smith's Ferry was originally a part of the Connecticut River Railroad system, with a homonymous passenger station which served the Mount Holyoke Seminary during the 19th century. While there are no passenger or freight stops in Smith's Ferry today, the track which traverses the area is serviced by Pan Am Southern, which operates a freight line from Hartford to White River Junction.

The railroad is also a part of the Vermonter Amtrak route which began service between stations in downtown Holyoke and Northampton in August 2015.

== Government ==
The neighborhood lies in the 7th Ward of the City of Holyoke, and is locally represented by Councilman Todd McGee as well as members elected-at-large including Councilman Daniel Bresnahan, Councilman Howard B. Greaney, Councilman Michael J. Sullivan, Councilman James M. Leahy, Councilwoman Rebecca Lisi, Councilman Diosdado Lopez, Councilman Joseph M. McGiverin, and Councilman Peter R. Tallman.

== See also ==
- Mountain Park (Holyoke, Massachusetts)
- Mount Tom (Massachusetts)
