= Land trust =

Conservation organization

Land trusts are nonprofit organizations which own and manage land, and sometimes waters. There are three common types of land trust, distinguished from one another by the ways in which they are legally structured and by the purposes for which they are organized and operated:

- A real estate investment trust is a fiduciary arrangement whereby one party (the trustee) agrees to own and to manage real property for the benefit of a limited number of beneficiaries.
- A community land trust (CLT) is a private, nonprofit corporation that acquires, manages, and develops land for a variety of purposes, primarily for the production and stewardship of affordable housing, although many CLTs are also engaged in non-residential buildings and uses.
- A conservation land trust is a private, non-profit corporation in the US that acquires land or conservation easements for the purpose of limiting commercial development and preserving open space, natural areas, waterways, and/or productive farms and forests.

In the United States, the land owned by the United States government and held in trust for Native American tribes and individuals is sometimes referred to as a land trust.

In Australia, Aboriginal land trusts are a type of non-profit organisation that holds the freehold title to an area of land on behalf of a community of Aboriginal and/or Torres Strait Islander people.

== History ==
=== Ancient example ===
Possible earliest concept of equity in land held in trust is the depiction of this ancient king (trustor) which grants property back to its previous owner (beneficiary) during his absence, supported by witness testimony (trustee). In essence and in this case, the king, in place of the later state (trustor and holder of assets at highest position) issues ownership along with past proceeds (equity) back to the beneficiary:

On the testimony of Gehazi the servant of Elisha that the woman was the owner of these lands, the king returns all her property to her. From the fact that the king orders his eunuch to return to the woman all her property and the produce of her land from the time that she left ...

=== Roman era ===
Land trusts have been around at least since Roman times but their clearest history is from the time of King Henry VIII in England. At that time, people used land trusts to hide their ownership of land so they would not have to serve in the military or fulfill other obligations of land ownership. For example, an elder uncle would hold his nephew's land so he would not have to join the king's army. To end this, King Henry in 1536 passed the Statute of Uses. The statute declared that if one party held land "for the use of" or in trust for another ("beneficiary"), then legal title was vested in the beneficiary. Obviously, if the statute had been given literal effect, there would be no trust law. Shortly after the statute was enacted, however, English courts declared that the statute only applied if the trust was passive, that is, the trustee didn't do anything but hold the land.

=== United States ===
In late 19th-century Chicago, some people figured out that land trusts would be good for buying property for investors to build skyscrapers on, and city aldermen figured they would be a good way to hide their ownership in land since they were forbidden to vote on city building projects when they owned land nearby. Because the law of England, including the Statute of Uses, was present in US law, the question arose whether a land trust would be valid. This question went to the Illinois Supreme Court. It ruled that if a land trust was set up with some minor duty on the trustee (such as to deed the property to the beneficiaries 20 years later), then the trust would not be considered passive and would be valid. Thus, the land trust in America today is often called an "Illinois-type" land trust or "Illinois Land Trust".

Land trusts have been actively used in Illinois for over a hundred years and in recent decades have begun to be used in other states. The declaration of a trust is through a "deed to trustee". If the trust is filed as a public document, it removes all of the asset protection provided by the formation of the land trust. Robert Pless pioneered the use of the land trust that has been used by many firms throughout the United States since the early 1990s.

== Types ==
=== Community land trusts ===
Community land trusts trace their conceptual history to England's Garden Cities, India's Gramdan Movement, and Israel's cooperative agricultural settlements, the moshavim. As Robert Swann and his co-authors noted in The Community Land Trust: A New Model for Land Tenure in America (1972): "The ideas behind the community land trust...have historic roots" in the indigenous Americas, in pre-colonial Africa, and in ancient Chinese economic systems. Thus, "the goal is to 'restore' the land trust concept rather than initiate it."

=== Real estate investment trusts ===
A real estate investment trust is a fiduciary arrangement whereby one party (the trustee) agrees to own and to manage real property for the benefit of a limited number of beneficiaries.

=== Conservation land trusts ===
Land trusts used primarily for the protection and stewardship of natural areas or for the preservation of productive lands for food or fiber are most commonly called conservation land trusts, but may also be called land conservancies. They have been in existence since 1891. However, conservation land trusts were not well known before the 1980s. Conservation communities are examples of such land trusts.

==== History ====
The first conservation land trust The Trustees of Reservations was founded in 1891. In 1976, Ben Emory, new director of the Maine Coast Heritage Trust, had begun to call on Boston lawyer Kingsbury Browne for advice on federal tax issues related to conservation easements. Emory recruited a handful of other land trusts as clients for Browne's periodic tax letters, and a small communications network of land trusts evolved.

When Congress considered new legislation relating to tax deductibility of easements, the Brandywine Conservancy, led by Bill Sellers, convened land trusts using easements in December 1979. Browne invited the under-secretary of the Treasury for tax policy, who brought IRS staff Stephen Small. The land trusts agreed to hire lobbyists and coordinate efforts to influence the legislation, winning expansion of the conservation purposes for which easements would qualify for deductibility.

Meanwhile, on the other side of the country, the Trust for Public Land sponsored a small gathering in San Francisco of established and newly forming Western land trusts in February 1978.

By 1980, more than 400 local and regional land trusts existed, most still in the North-east, three-fourths with no paid staff, and half with annual budgets under $50,000. The majority of land was protected by fee ownership, but the use of conservation easements was growing.

Then influences converged: the geographic spread resulting in isolation of newer land trusts; recognition of the difficulty of influencing vital legislation; and the growing engagement of Kingsbury Browne in land conservation, leading to his desire to learn about land trusts across the country. A movement was about to be born.

The number of land trusts steadily increased in the United States, with most forming in the late twentieth century. There are also land trusts working in Canada (e.g. Nature Conservancy of Canada, Escarpment Biosphere Conservancy, Wildlife Preservation Canada, Edmonton & Area Land Trust, Ecotrust Canada, Georgian Bay Land Trust and Thames Talbot Land Trust), Mexico, and other countries worldwide, in addition to international land trusts like The Nature Conservancy and the World Land Trust.

==== Aims ====
The goal of conservation trusts is to preserve sensitive natural areas, farmland, ranchland, water sources, cultural resources or notable landmarks. These include enormous international organizations such as The Nature Conservancy or World Land Trust, as well as smaller organizations that operate on national, state/provincial, county, and community levels. Conservation trusts often, but not always, target lands adjacent to or within existing protected areas. However, land areas that are particularly valuable in terms of natural or cultural resources or are home to endangered plant or wildlife are good candidates for receiving protection efforts.

Land trusts conserve all different types of land. Some protect only farmland or ranchland, others forests, mountains, prairies, deserts, wildlife habitat, cultural resources such as archaeological sites or battlefields, urban parks, scenic corridors, coastlines, wetlands or waterways; it is up to each organization to decide what type of land to protect according to its mission. Some areas have extremely limited public access for the protection of sensitive wildlife, or to allow recovery of damaged ecosystems.

Many protected areas are under private ownership, which tends to limit access. However, in many cases, land trusts work to eventually open up the land in a limited way to the public for recreation in the form of hunting, hiking, camping, wildlife observation, watersports, or other responsible outdoor activities. This is often with the assistance of community groups or government programs. Some land is also used for sustainable agriculture or ranching, or for sustainable logging. While important, these goals can be seen as secondary to protection of the land from development.

==== Strategies ====
Many different strategies are used to provide this protection, including outright acquisition of the land by the trust. In other cases, the land will remain in private hands, but the trust will purchase a conservation easement on the property to prevent development, or purchase any mining, logging, drilling, or development rights on the land. Trusts also provide funding to assist like-minded private buyers or government organizations to purchase and protect the land forever.

As non-profit organizations, land trusts rely on donations, grants and public land acquisition programs for operating expenses and for acquiring land and easements. Donors often provide monetary support, but it is common for conservation-minded landowners to donate an easement on their land, or the land itself. Some land trusts also receive funds from government programs to acquire, protect, and manage land. Some trusts can afford to pay employees, but many others depend entirely on volunteers. According to the 2005 National Land Trust Census, 31% of land trusts reported having at least one full-time staff member, 54% are all volunteer, and 15% have only part-time staff.

When land is acquired, trusts will sometimes retain ownership of the land in perpetuity, or sell the land to a third party. This third party is often the government, which will usually add the land to an existing protected area, or create a new one entirely. Land trusts were instrumental in the 2004 creation of Great Sand Dunes National Park in Colorado, as well as the expansion of Hawaii Volcanoes National Park by 50% in 2003. Land trusts also sell land to private buyers, usually with a strict conservation easement attached.

Land trusts use many different tools in their protection efforts. Land trusts buy or accept donations of land in fee. This means that the landowner will sell fee simple interest to the land trust or will just give the land they own to an organization. Landowners may also sell or donate a conservation easement to a land trust.

A landowner that donates a conservation easement to a land trust gives up some of the rights associated with the land. For example, the landowner might give up the right to build additional structures, while retaining the right to grow crops. Future owners also will be bound by the conservation easement's terms. The land trust is responsible for making sure the easement's terms are followed. This is done through monitoring of the land.

Conservation easements offer great flexibility. An easement on property containing rare wildlife habitat might prohibit any development, for example, while an easement on a working farm might allow the addition of agricultural structures. An easement may apply to all or a portion of the property, and need not require public access. Each conservation easement is carefully crafted to meet the needs of the landowner while not jeopardizing the conservation values of the land.

In between selling land or an easement to a land trust is an option called a bargain sale. A bargain sale is where a landowner sells a property interest to an organization for less than the market price. The amount of value between the market price and the actual sale price is considered a donation to the organization. There are other strategies to conserve land as well.

In October 2002, Property and Environment Research Center published a report by Dominic P. Parker entitled Cost-Effective Strategies for Conserving Private Land. This paper identified numerous ways for operating land trusts more efficiently, pointing out that conservation easement and other tools for land preservation may be less costly than ownership. Sometimes the various rights associated with land ownership are separable. A preservationist organization may, for instance, buy only the extraction rights on a property with oil or minerals, and then rent those rights to extracters on the organization's terms. The terms might include requirements to protect the environment and pay the organization royalties on materials extracted. Many land trust organizations had already been using these strategies for years when this report was published.

==== Structure ====
The Land Trust Alliance, formed in 1981, provides technical support to land trusts in the United States. The Alliance performs a National Land Trust Census that keeps track of the land protected by local and regional land trusts. The last Census, conducted in 2003, reported that these trusts have protected almost 9.4 million acres (38,000 km^{2}) of land in the United States, double the 4.7 million acres (19,000 km^{2}) recorded in the 1998 survey. Over 5 million acres (20,000 km^{2}) of that was protected by conservation easement in 2003. Although it does not include national or international land trusts in its Census, the LTA estimates another 25 million acres (100,000 km^{2}) in the U.S. have been protected by those organizations. The largest amount of land protected by local and regional trusts is in the Northeast with 2.9 million acres (12,000 km^{2}), while the fastest growing region between 1998 and 2003 was the Pacific (consisting of California, Nevada, and Hawaii), with protected land increasing 147% to 1.5 million acres (6,100 km^{2}) in 2003.

== Other types ==
In the United States; approximately 230,000 square kilometres (89,000 sq mi) (as of 2008) of land are owned by the United States government and held in trust for Native American tribes and individuals.

In Australia, Aboriginal land trusts are a type of non-profit organisation that holds the freehold title to an area of land on behalf of a community of Aboriginal and/or Torres Strait Islander people.

== See also ==
- Conservation community
- Cooperative
- Green belt
- Intentional community
