= Edmonton & Area Land Trust =

Edmonton and Area Land Trust
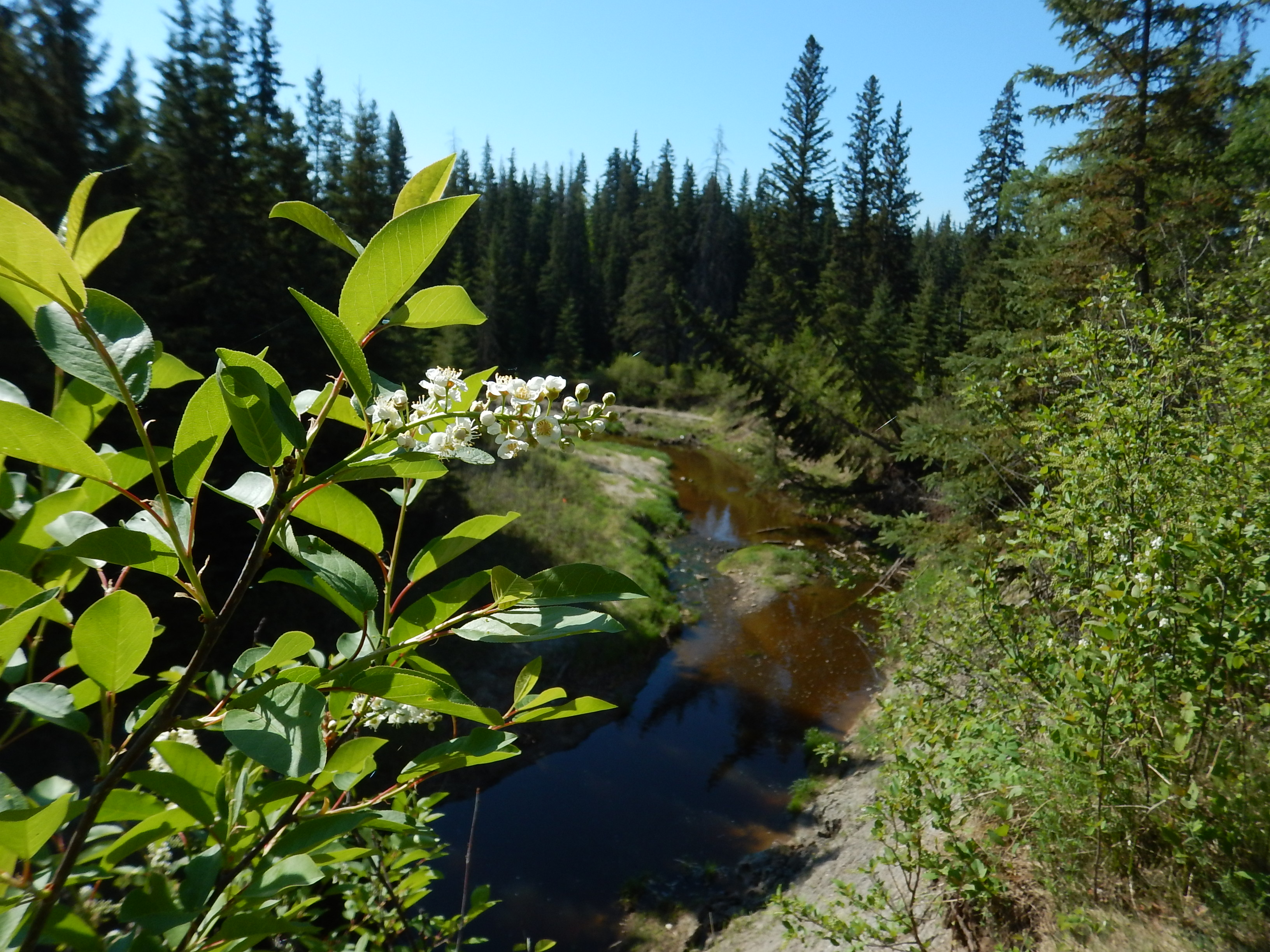
- Larch Sanctuary
- Founded: 2007
- Type: Land trust
- Location: Edmonton, Alberta, Canada
- Region served: Edmonton and Area
- Method: Conservation through Private Stewardship
- Website: www.ealt.ca

Edmonton and Area Land Trust (EALT) is a regional non-profit organization based in Edmonton, Alberta, Canada. EALT promotes conservation of the natural heritage of Edmonton and area through private stewardship, and is registered as a charitable agency with the Canada Revenue Agency. The land trust stewards 22 natural areas in the Edmonton area.

== Method ==
EALT approaches the conservation of natural areas through land trust using three basic tools:

- Land acquisition through purchase or donation
- Conservation easement
- Education and stewardship

== History ==
The EALT was established in 2007 by a group of six local founding Members:

- City of Edmonton
- Edmonton Community Foundation
- Edmonton Nature Club
- Urban Development Institute - Greater Edmonton Chapter
- Land Stewardship Centre of Canada
- Legacy Lands Conservation Society

== Conservation lands ==
EALT secures and conserves ecologically significant lands in the Edmonton region. These include:

- Boisvert’s Greenwoods
- Bunchberry Meadows
- Coates
- Conservation Easement in Parkland County
- Glory Hills
- Golden Ranches
- Hicks
- Larch Sanctuary
- Lu Carbyn Nature Sanctuary
- Ministik
- Pipestone Creek
- Smith Blackburn Homestead

== See also ==
- Wildlife Preservation Canada
- Ecotrust Canada
