= Conservation economy =

A conservation economy is an ideal, imagined economy in which economic wealth is harvested from a bioregion's local natural resources in a way that meets local communities' needs yet restores rather than depletes natural and social capital.

In a conservation economy, economic arrangements of all kinds are gradually redesigned so that they restore, rather than deplete, natural capital and social capital...Even in a globalizing economy, diverse bioregional economies that are more self-sufficient in meeting their own needs will be more competitive and less vulnerable...

The primary agents expected to ultimately transform local economies and move bioregions towards locally resilient and enduring 'conservation economies' are small plus medium-sized business owners ('conservation entrepreneurs') who embrace a conservation ethic and take a rational self-interest in maintaining and restoring local ecosystems.

Individuals and organizations that see its potential and acquire the skills to build [a conservation economy] will create ongoing and enduring economic opportunities. Individuals and organizations that continue to depend on the depletion of social and natural capital will face increasingly unpredictable global commodity markets, tightening laws and regulations, new taxes, public outrage, loss of motivation, and many other symptoms of economic transformation...

Key advocates spending many years taking a lead in promoting the benefits of conservation economies and investing in local businesses to help build conservation economies have been the not-for-profit organization, Ecotrust, (founded in 1991 by economist Spencer Beebe) and its partners: Ecotrust Canada, ShoreBank Pacific, and ShoreBank Enterprise Pacific.

== See also ==
- Ecotrust
- Ecological economics
- Environmental economics
- Green economy
