= Vancouver Zoo =

Vancouver Zoo may refer to:

- the Stanley Park Zoo in Vancouver, British Columbia, started as a pound in 1888 and closed in December 1997
- the Greater Vancouver Zoo in Aldergrove, British Columbia, opened in August 1970 as the Vancouver Game Farm
