= Portland Fermentation Festival =

Annual event in Portland, Oregon, U.S.

- Poster for the 2026 festival
- Nickname: Stinkfest
- Status: Active
- Frequency: Annually
- Venue: Natural Capital Center
- Locations: Portland, Oregon, United States
- Inaugurated: 2009
- Founder: Liz Crain
- Website: portlandfermentationfestival.com

The Portland Fermentation Festival, also known as "Stinkfest", is an annual festival in Portland, Oregon, United States. Co-founded by Liz Crain in 2009, the event features fermented foods and drinks such as breads, cheeses, cider, kimchi, kombucha, miso, natto, pickles, and sauerkraut.

== History ==
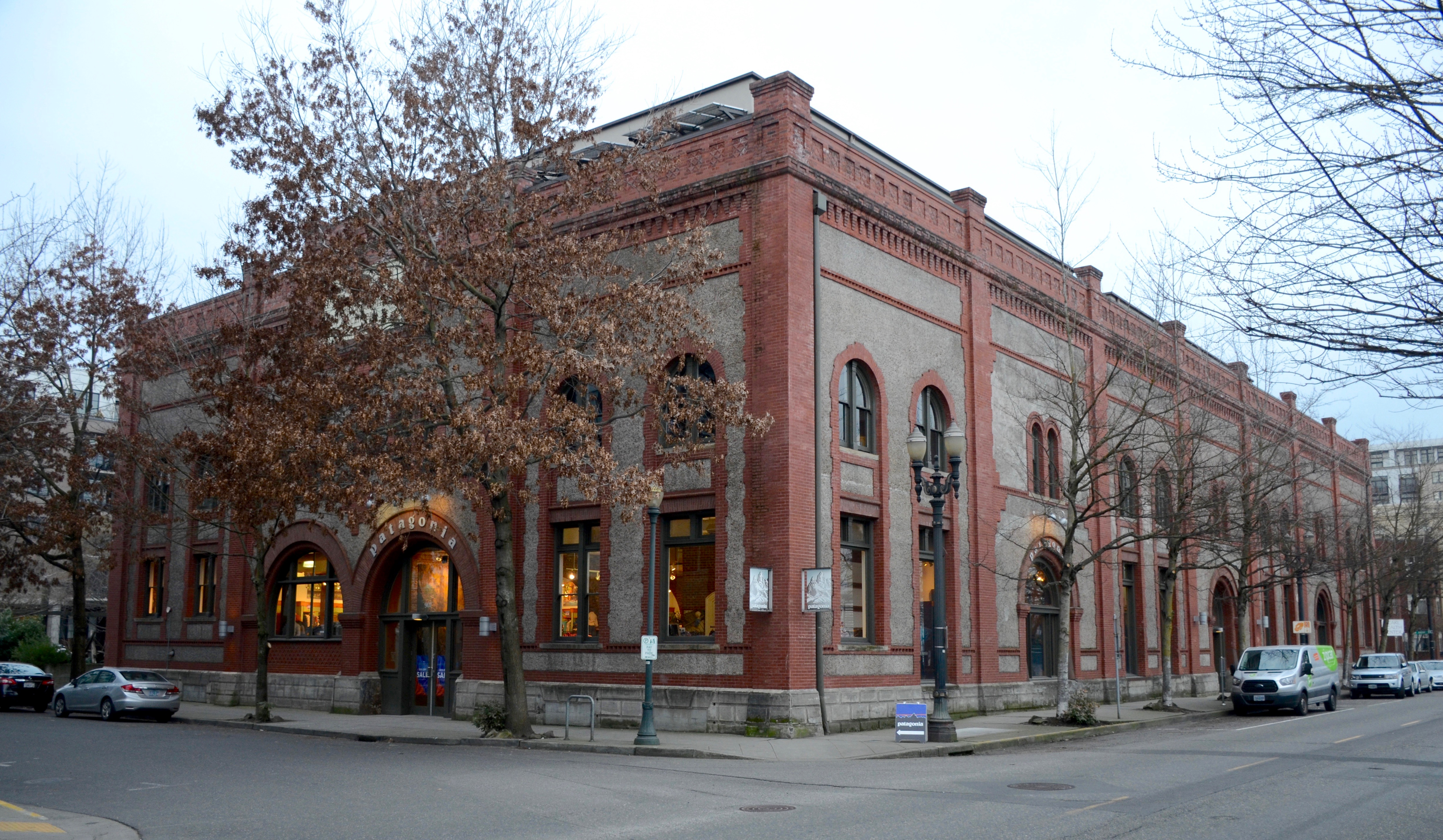
Exterior of the Natural Capital Center, which hosts the event.

The 2017 event was held at the Natural Capital Center (also known as the Ecotrust Building), in northwest Portland's Pearl District, and showcased approximately 50 types of foods and drinks. The 2018 and 2019 festivals were held at the same venue. The 2020, 2021, and 2022 events were canceled because of the COVID-19 pandemic. Organizers opted not to host virtual activities.

The 2023 event was held at the Natural Capital Center and featured a disc jockey, a traditional Japanese fermentation dance, food from Desi PDX, and a new "bacterial petting zoo". The 2024, 2025, and 2026 events were held at the same venue.

== Reception ==
In 2019, Benjamin Teller of Portland Monthly called the festival "one of the city’s most ... well, Portland events: nonprofit, volunteer-run, and deliciously ripe with bubbling crockpots".

== See also ==
- Culture of Portland, Oregon
- Fermentation in food processing
- List of festivals in the United States
