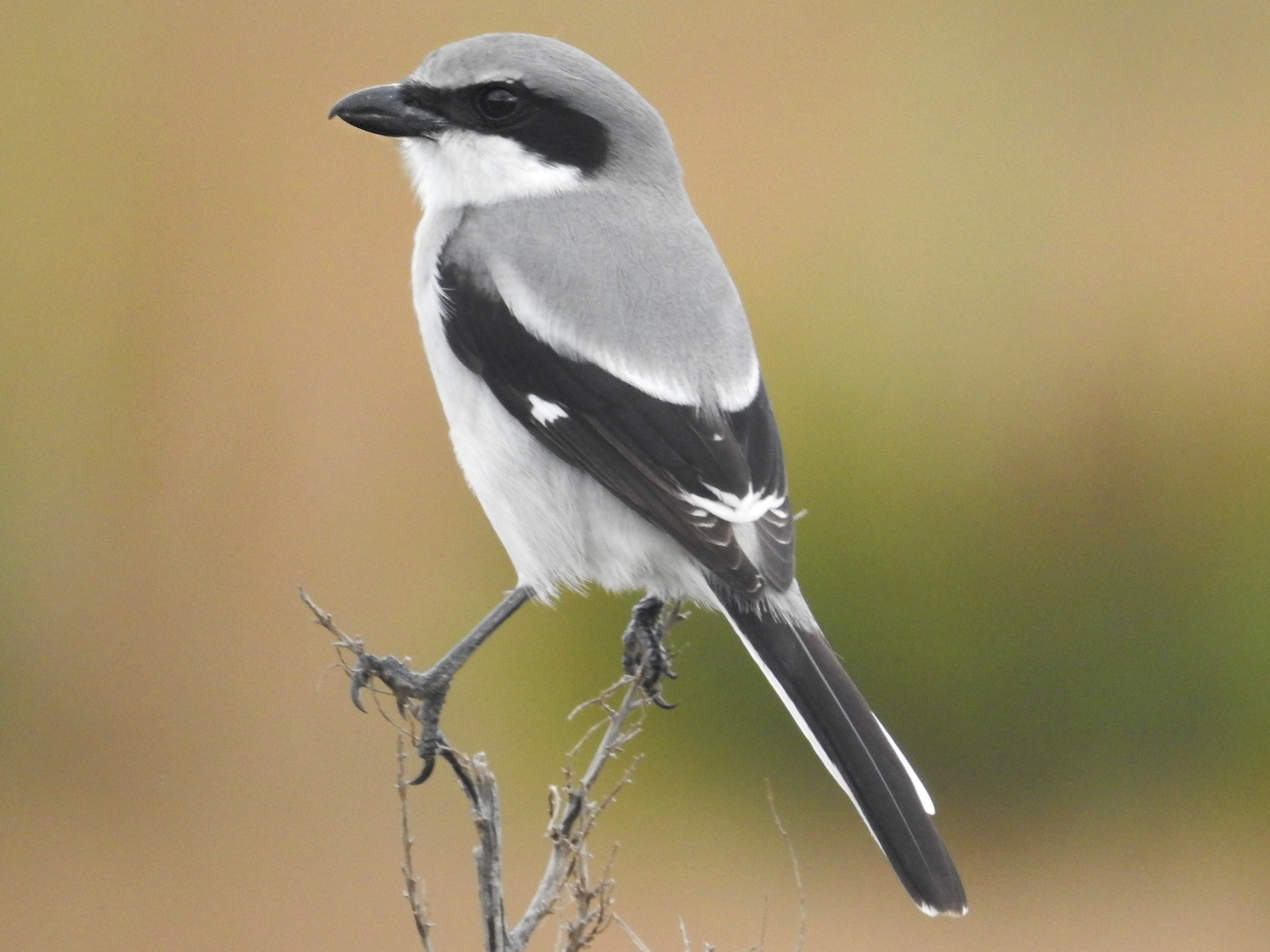
- In Florida, US

Conservation status
- Near Threatened (IUCN 3.1)

- Apparently Secure (NatureServe)

Scientific classification
- Kingdom: Animalia
- Phylum: Chordata
- Class: Aves
- Order: Passeriformes
- Family: Laniidae
- Genus: Lanius
- Species: L. ludovicianus

Binomial name
- Lanius ludovicianus Linnaeus, 1766
- Approximate distribution range Breeding Year-round Non-breeding

= Loggerhead shrike =

Loggerhead shrike Temporal range: Late Pleistocene–present

Species of bird

The loggerhead shrike (Lanius ludovicianus) is a passerine bird in the family Laniidae. It is the only member of the shrike family endemic to North America; the related northern shrike (L. borealis) occurs north of its range; however, it is also found in Siberia. It is nicknamed the butcherbird after its carnivorous tendencies, as it consumes prey such as insects, amphibians, lizards, small mammals and small birds, and some prey end up displayed and stored at a site, for example in a tree. Due to its small size and weak talons, this predatory bird relies on impaling its prey upon thorns or barbed wire for facilitated consumption. The numbers of loggerhead shrike have significantly decreased in recent years, especially in Midwestern, New England and Mid-Atlantic areas.

== Taxonomy ==
In 1760 the French zoologist Mathurin Jacques Brisson included a description of the loggerhead shrike in his Ornithologie based on a specimen collected in Louisiana in the United States. He used the French name La pie-griesche de la Louisiane and the Latin Lanius ludovicianus. Although Brisson coined Latin names, these do not usually conform to the binomial system and are not recognised by the International Commission on Zoological Nomenclature. When in 1766 the Swedish naturalist Carl Linnaeus updated his Systema Naturae for the twelfth edition, he added 240 species that had been previously described by Brisson. One of these was the loggerhead shrike. Linnaeus included a brief description, adopted the binomial name Lanius ludovicianus (identical to Brisson's Latin name) and cited Brisson's work. The specific name ludovic is Late Latin for "Louis" and the epithet "-ianus" is to describe something being of another or possessed by it. When translated, its scientific name means something alongside the lines of "Louis' butcher". "Loggerhead," a similar word to "blockhead," refers to the unusually large head to body ratio of this bird.

There are seven recognized subspecies:

- L. l. excubitorides Swainson, 1832 – central Canada, central and west USA
- L. l. migrans Palmer, W, 1898 – east North America
- L. l. ludovicianus Linnaeus, 1766 – coastal southeast USA
- L. l. anthonyi Mearns, 1898 – Channel Islands (off south California, southwest USA)
- L. l. mearnsi Ridgway, 1903 – San Clemente Island (off south California, southwest USA)
- L. l. grinnelli Oberholser, 1919 – extreme south California and north Baja California (northwest Mexico)
- L. l. mexicanus Brehm, CL, 1854 – west and central Mexico, south Baja California (northwest Mexico)

Miller, in 1931, suggested that the wing-chord-to-tail-length ratio was an important indicator for distinguishing between subspecies. Lanius ludovicianus migrans, found in eastern North America, can be distinguished from the western subspecies, L. l. excubitorides by wing length, tail length, and colour. L. l. migrans have a paler forehead than the top of the head. According to Mundy et al.'s 1997 study, there is a substantial genetic difference between the island subspecies L. l. mearnsi and the mainland subspecies L. l. gambeli due to a gene flow barrier between the two species.

== Description ==
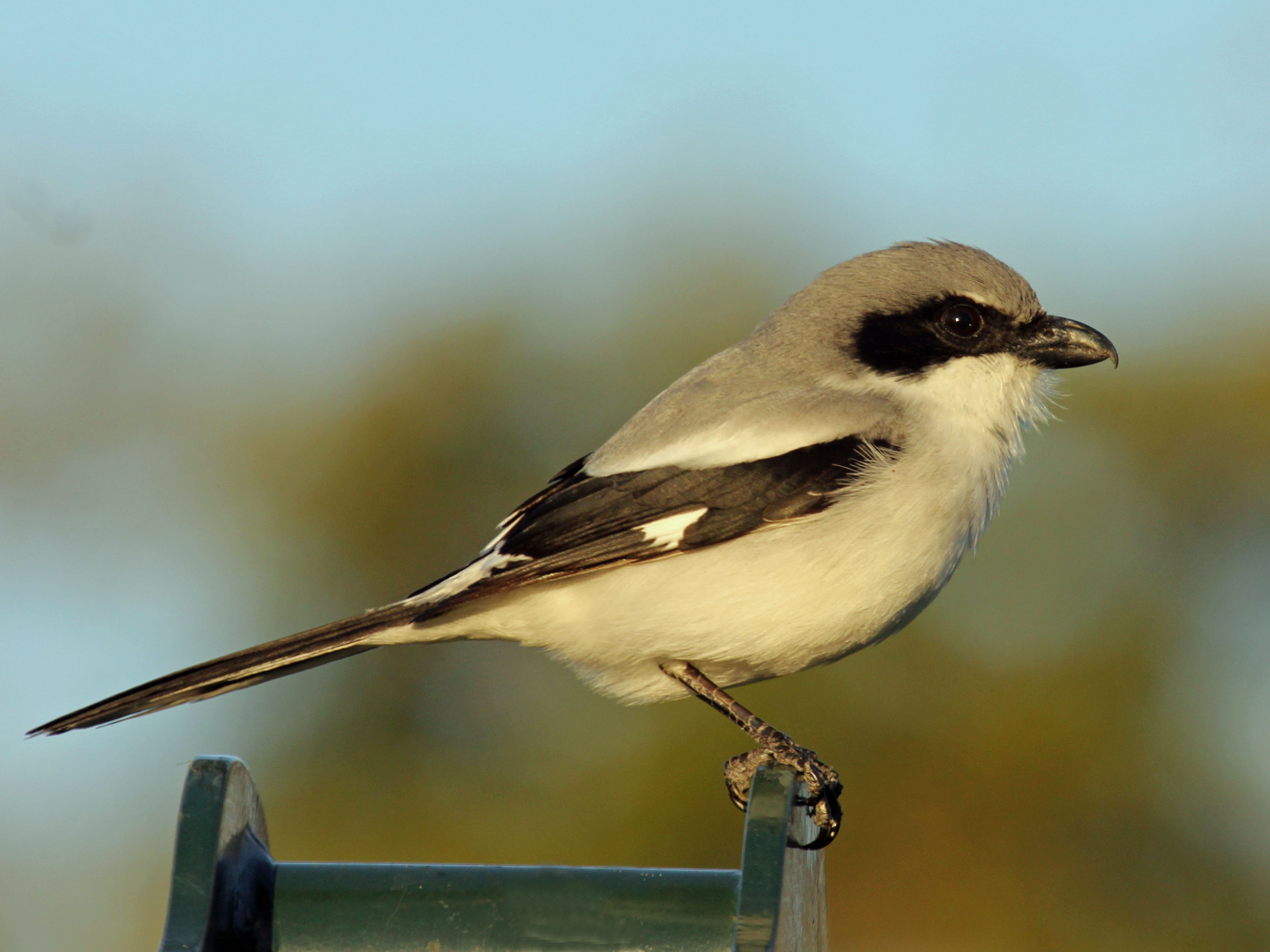
In Florida

The loggerhead shrike is a medium-sized passerine. "Loggerhead" refers to the relatively large size of the head as compared to the rest of the body. The wing and tail length are about 3.82 in (9.70 cm) and 3.87 in (9.83 cm) long, respectively. It weighs on average 1.8 oz (50 g), with a range of 1.6–2.1 oz (45–60 g) for a healthy adult shrike.

Measurement ranges

- Length: 7.9–9.1 in (20–23 cm)
- Weight: 1.2–1.8 oz (34–51 g)
- Wingspan: 11.0–12.6 in (27.9–32.0 cm)

The adult plumage of the loggerhead shrike is grey above with a white to pale grey breast and black tarsi and feet. The bird possesses a black mask that extends across the eyes to its bill. The wings are black with a distinct white patch on the primaries. The tail is black edged with white and the irises are brown. The beak is short, black, and hooked, and contains a tomial tooth to help tear into prey. It is difficult to sex an adult loggerhead shrike in the field as they are sexually monochromatic. However, several studies have reported sexual dimorphism in plumage and size traits. Juveniles possess a paler gray plumage that is subtly vermiculated.

The loggerhead shrike can be distinguished from the northern shrike by its smaller size, darker grey plumage, and larger black face mask that covers the eye completely. It also has a shorter bill with less prominent hook than the northern shrike. Their calls are similar.

=== Vocalization ===
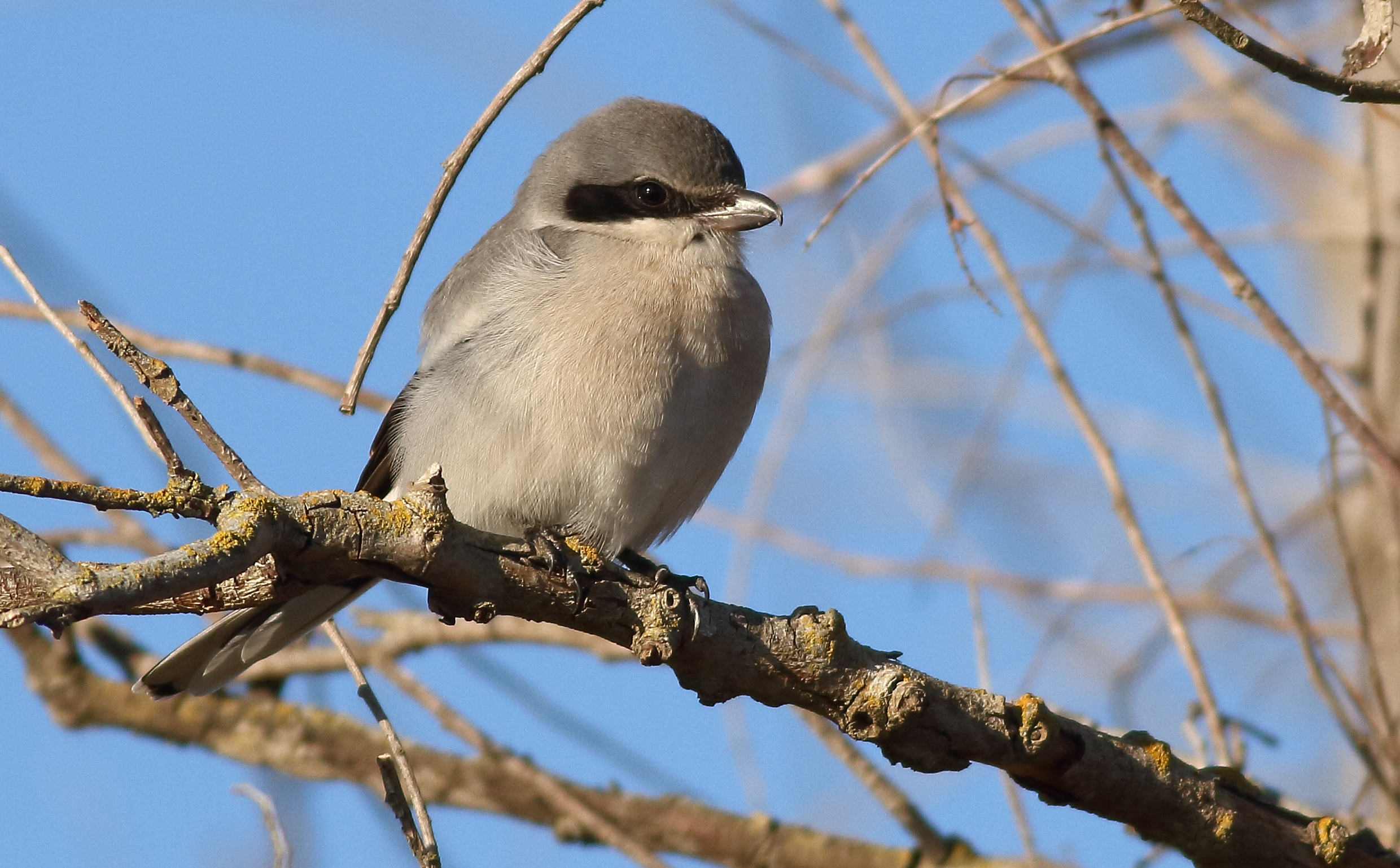
In Yolo County, California.

Their vocal range is broad and varied, and has been described as harsh and jarring. The shrike's notes include squeaky whistles, shrill trills, and guttural warbles. The trills sung by males during breeding season vary in rhythm and pitch. When alarmed, a shrike will produce a "schgra-a-a" shriek while spreading out its tail feathers. A distinctive alarm call is often given when threats from above are detected. Nestlings will make "tcheek" and "tsp" sounds shortly after hatching. During courtship feedings, females may ask for food with "mak" begging notes; conversely, males emit "wuut" or "shack" sounds to offer food. The male emits a territorial, harsh shriek, while the female's song is pitched lower and softer than the male's. Generally, the male is far more vocal than the female.

== Distribution and habitat ==
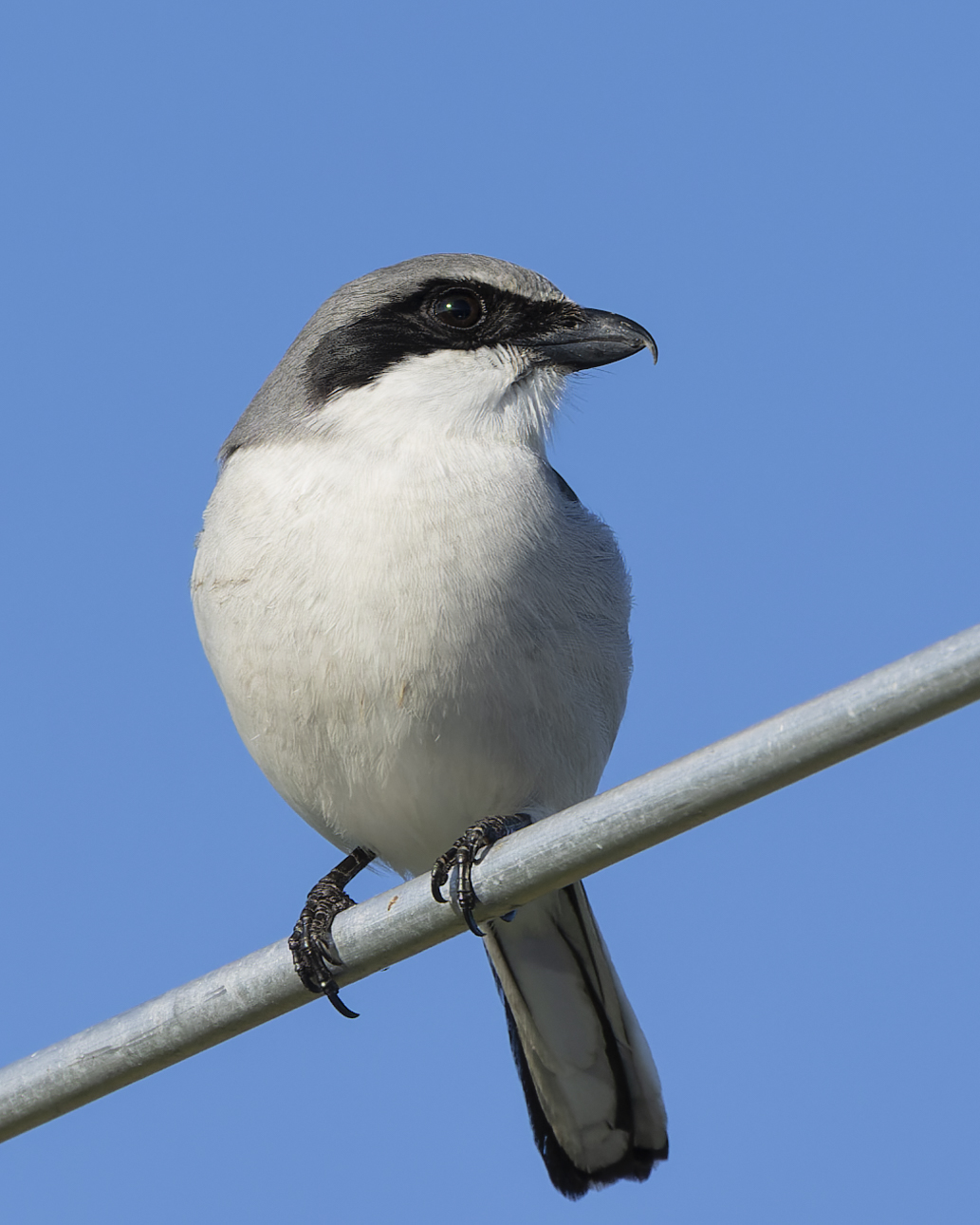
In Tatum, Florida

Loggerhead shrikes were once widely distributed across southern Canada, the contiguous USA and Mexico. However, their populations have heavily declined since the 1960s. Four subspecies reside in southern coastal California: mearnsi, gambeli, grinnelli and anthonyi. L. l. mearnsi is only found on San Clemente Island in California, whereas L. l. gambeli breeds on the mainland and L. l. anthonyi breeds on the Channel Islands. L. l. excubitorides is found in central North America, whereas the non-migrating L. l. ludovicianus resides in southeastern North America. The distribution of L. l. migrans ranges from north to eastern North America; however, its range has been diminishing since the 1940s.

The bird requires an open habitat with an area to forage, elevated perches, and nesting sites. They are often found in open pastures or grasslands and appear to prefer red-cedar and hawthorn trees for nesting. The hawthorn's thorns and the cedar's pin-like needles protect and conceal the shrike from predators. It may also nest in fence-rows or hedge-rows near open pastures and requires elevated perches as lookout points for hunting. Open pastures and grasslands with shorter vegetation are preferred by loggerhead shrikes, as they increase the bird's hunting efficiency. Longer vegetation often requires more time and energy to be spent searching for prey, so these birds gravitate towards areas of shorter vegetation.

== Behavior ==
=== Diet ===
Loggerhead shrikes have been repeatedly observed killing prey larger than themselves by spearing the neck or head of the animal and twisting. The speed at which this occurs causes a whiplash injury to the animal. The neck strength of the shrikes compensates, making their talon weakness inconsequential.

Although loggerhead shrikes are passerines, they are a predatory species that hunt during the day. They primarily eat insects, but also consume arachnids, reptiles, amphibians, rodents, bats and small birds. They have even eaten venomous snakes such as the water adder. The size of prey ranges from 0.001 g (3.5×10^{−5} oz) insects to 25 g (0.88 oz) mice or reptiles.

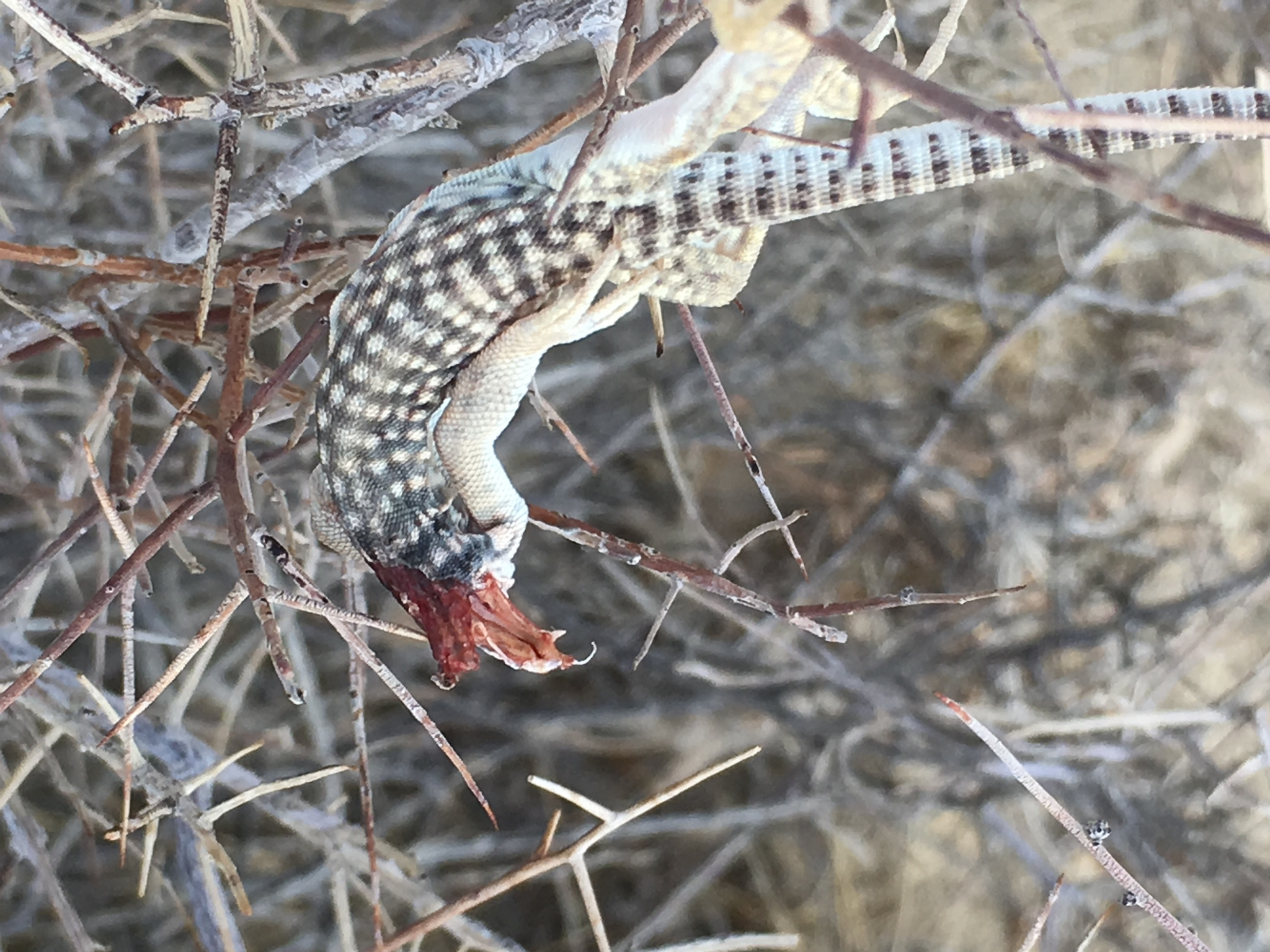
Desert iguana pinned to a white rhatany shrub by a loggerhead shrike. In California.

They are not true birds of prey, as they lack the large, strong talons used to catch and kill prey. Instead, they are sit-and-wait hunters that stalk prey by hawking and diving from elevated perches. By scanning their vicinity from a perch instead of flying, the shrike does not exhaust its energy during the search. Preferred perches are approximately 13 ft (4.0 m) off the ground, and are usually outer branches of trees or telephone wires. In winter, prey availability is low due to the shrike's preference for insects and poikilothermic prey; during this time, shrikes may be energetically stressed and underweight. Insects are consumed in mid-flight, but vertebrates usually require more handling time and therefore more energy. Due to the shrike's small size in proportion to the size of its prey, it must rely on specialized adaptations to facilitate its hunting. The powerful, hooked beak of the loggerhead shrike allows it to sever the neck of a small vertebrate. Larger prey are subjected to impaling, in which they are pushed down into a sharp projection, such as a thorn or barbed wire. The bird can then tear off flesh by using the projection as an anchor. The shrike may also use the thorn to fasten and store its food to return to at a later time.

The motion of impalement appears to be instinctive, as parent shrikes do not demonstrate the behavior to their nestlings. However, a young shrike must experience impaling prey upon an actual projection during a critical developmental period; otherwise, it will not learn to use the instinctive impaling action upon an actual projection. Kleptoparasitism has also been observed in nature, in which the shrike chased down another bird and stole its recently caught prey.

=== Reproduction ===
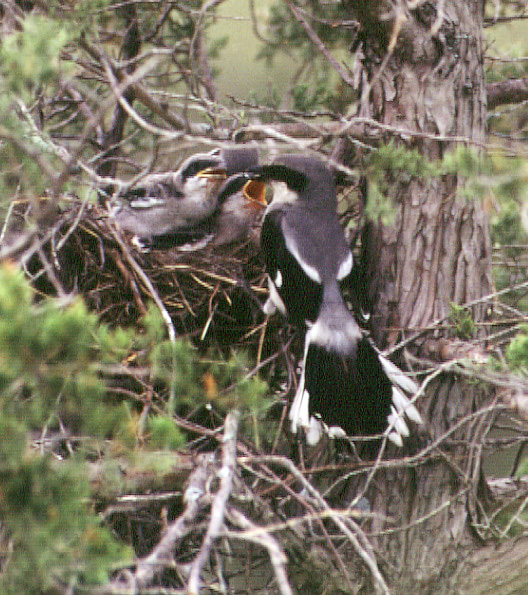
In Napanee, Ontario

Loggerhead shrikes are monogamous birds. However, males are known to begin second nesting attempts with a second female before his first clutch has fledged. They begin breeding during their first spring. During this time, the male performs a courtship ritual that occurs in flight. He dances erratically in the air, flying rapidly up and down and occasionally chasing the female. He presents himself to his potential mate by fanning out his tail and fluttering his wings. Females may respond to the fluttering display with begging notes, similar to those of juveniles begging for food; this encourages the male to feed her.

The bird breeds in semi-open areas in southern Ontario, Quebec, and the Canadian prairie provinces, south to Mexico. It typically nests in isolated or small clusters of dense trees and shrubs from near ground level to over 4m in height, though these shrikes have been recorded nesting on man-made structures like utility poles, houses, a portable cattle corral, and a solar farm collection cable line. There is an increase in average clutch size as latitude increases. Shrikes begin incubation after laying the second to last egg, resulting in asynchronous hatching. Incubation, on average, lasts 16 days. The female lays 4 to 8 eggs in a bulky cup made of twigs and grass. Once hatched, nestlings are fed by both the male and female parent. Average fledging period is about 19 days. Young may then remain nearby and dependent on adults for 3 to 4 weeks. After that, they begin to forage independently. Oftentimes, nestlings do not survive long past hatching. In the case of dead nestlings, adult shrikes may eat or discard their bodies or else feed them to their remaining young. The oldest recorded age of a loggerhead shrike was 12 years and 6 months.

== Conservation status ==
Loggerhead shrike populations have been decreasing in North America since the 1960s. Reasons behind the decline remain unclear, although suggestions include habitat loss, pesticide contamination, and human disturbance. The eastern loggerhead shrike (L. l. migrans) is critically endangered in Canada, with fewer than 35 known breeding pairs in Canada. The San Clemente Island shrike, L. l. mearnsi, is critically endangered, with a population as low as 5–10 individuals during 1983–1988. Although only this island subspecies is legally listed as endangered in the United States, the species is declining continent-wide and no longer occurs in most of the northeastern U.S.; it is extirpated from every state in New England, as well as New Brunswick and Nova Scotia. A captive population was established at the Toronto Zoo and McGill University in 1997. In 2001, an experimental field breeding and release program managed by Wildlife Preservation Canada was established. "Field breeding" refers to moving captive pairs from their wintering cages at the Toronto Zoo and McGill to large enclosures within shrike habitat in Ontario where the pairs nest and raise their young. The young then are released to the wild when they'd naturally disperse from their parents. Since 2004, over 90 young have been released annually and between 2% and 6.5% of young released have successfully migrated and returned to breed in the subsequent year.
