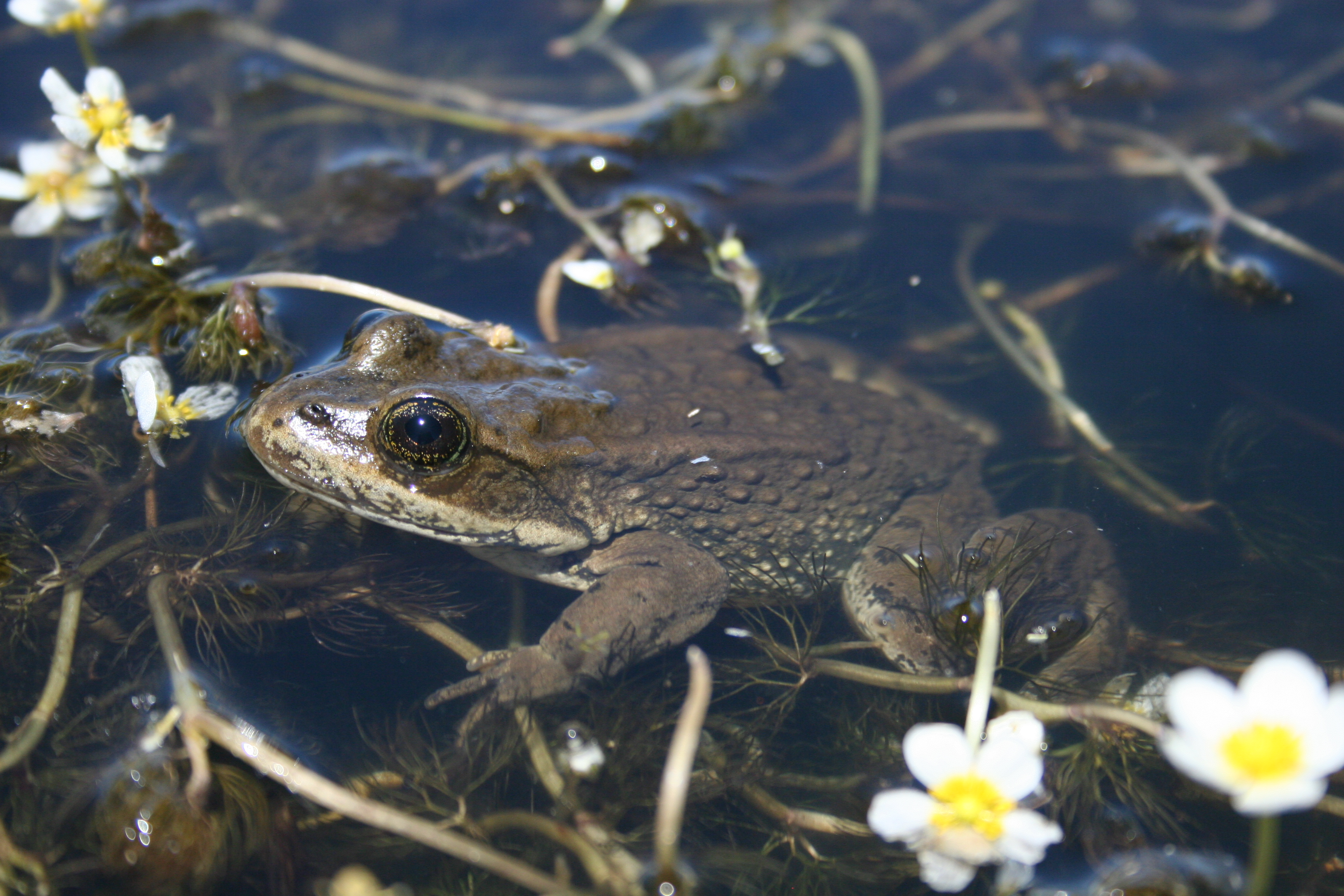

Conservation status
- Least Concern (IUCN 3.1)

Scientific classification
- Kingdom: Animalia
- Phylum: Chordata
- Class: Amphibia
- Order: Anura
- Family: Ranidae
- Genus: Rana
- Species: R. luteiventris

Binomial name
- Rana luteiventris Thompson, 1913

Synonyms
- Rana pretiosa luteiventris Thompson, 1913

= Columbia spotted frog =

Columbia spotted frog Rana luteiventris

Species of amphibian

The Columbia spotted frog (Rana luteiventris) is a North American species of frog. It is green to brown in color with spots on the dorsal surface. The belly and upper lip are white in color. Individuals can be distinguished from other Rana species by their shorter back legs, narrow snout, and upturned eyes. Since they spend most of their time in the water, they also have more webbing in their hind feet than similar species. Although not threatened, this animal has been studied as a model species for the effects of habitat fragmentation.

== Description ==
The Columbia spotted frog is a medium-sized frog reaching lengths of up to 3.5 in (89 mm). Its color ranges from a dark, olive green to light brown with irregularly shaped black spots on its back and legs (rendering its name). Its skin texture, like the rest of the genus, varies from a rough to a smooth texture, with small folds of skin along the back. This frog exhibits a unique feature regarding its color. A light-colored strip runs along the upper lip, and the ventral sides of the frog are usually colored either pink or yellow, but only in the adult form.

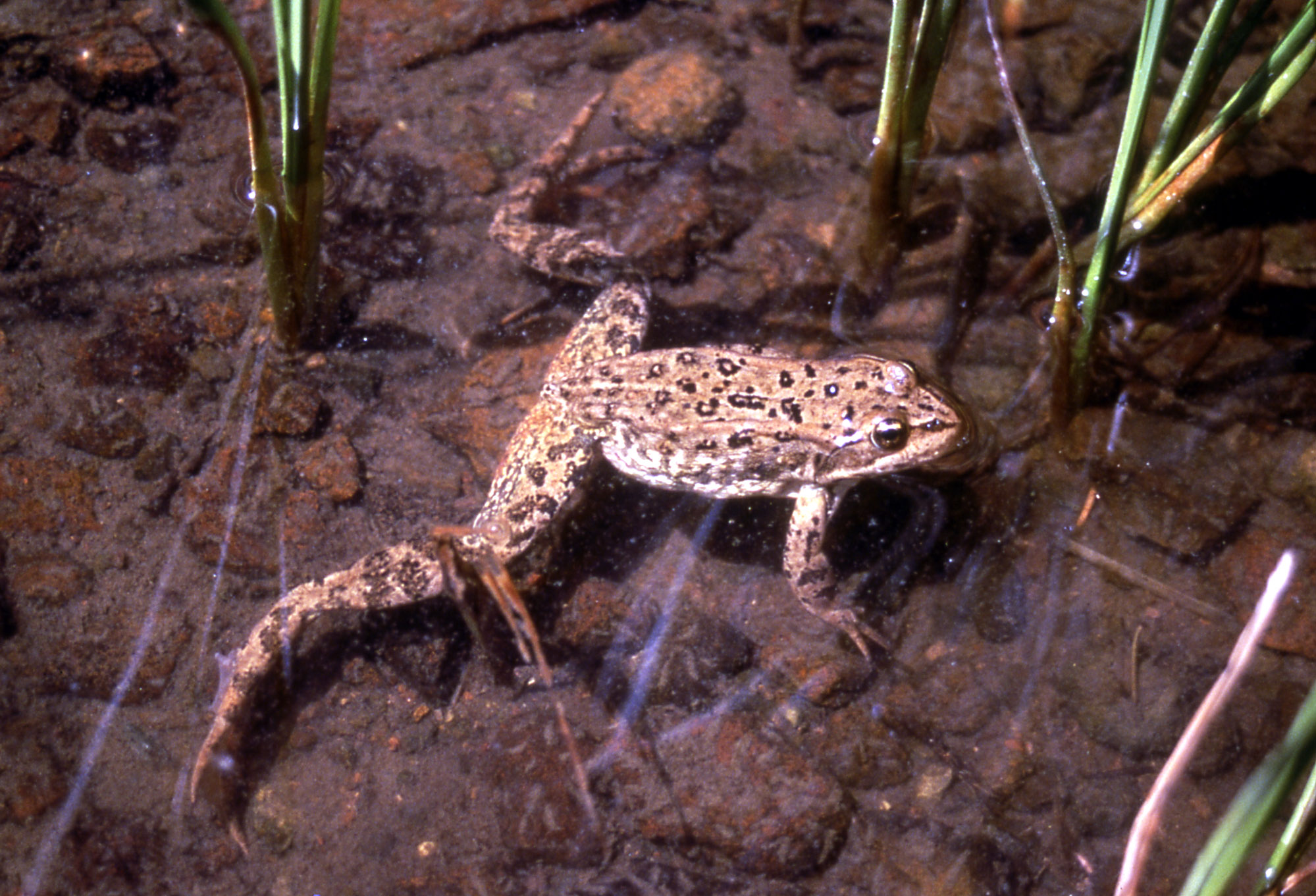
Columbia spotted frog

This frog is well known by a few of its physical characteristics, as well. It has a long, narrow out and upturned eyes. The spotted frog is known as a very aquatic amphibian; the webbing on its feet extends all the way to the end of its longest toe. When comparing this frog to others of the same size, such as the northern leopard frog, it tends to have shorter hind legs.

The tadpoles are brownish-green in color, which runs dorsally along the tadpole. Gold spots are also intermittent throughout this coloring. The tadpoles have upturned, inset eyes. They usually reach around 3.1 inches (79 mm) in length before maturing to adults.

== Habitat ==
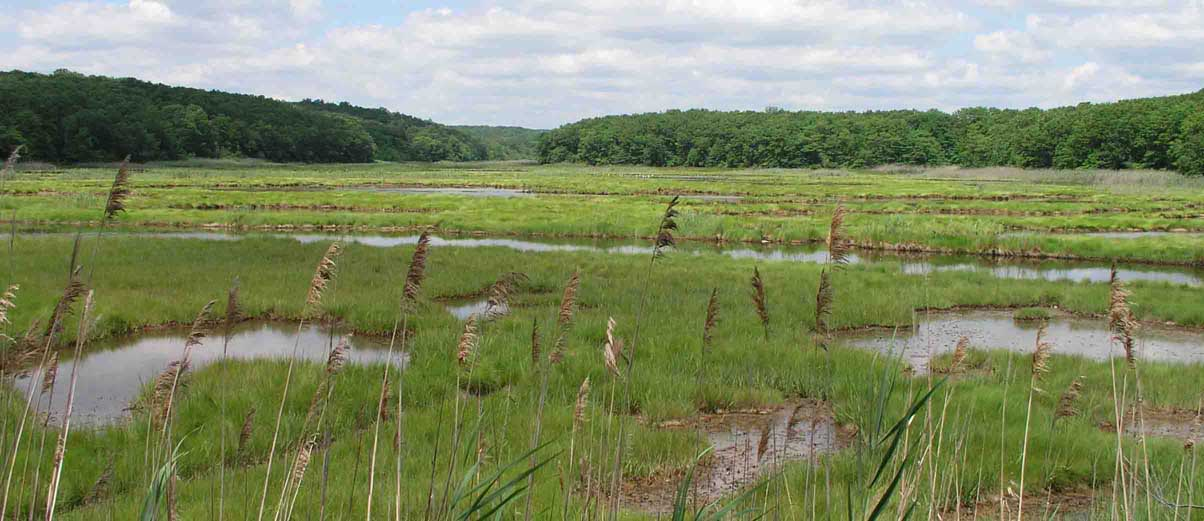
Example of marsh-like habitat

=== Geographical location ===
The Columbia spotted frog is widespread throughout western North America, from Alaska and parts of British Columbia to Washington, Idaho, and parts of Wyoming, Nevada, and Utah.

=== Habitat ===
The Columbia spotted frog, like most other frogs, is fairly aquatic. Their habitats are found generally near permanent bodies of water, which can include lakes, ponds, slow-moving streams, and marshes. These frogs were found to need specific habitat characteristics within these broader habitat characteristics. Adult spotted frogs inhabit mostly seasonally flooded sites, where the water source is constant, but at certain times of the year, increases exponentially in both the amount and level of water available.

=== Vegetation needs ===
These frogs are a constant victim to predation, so they require an abundant source of low-growing or emergent vegetation as shelter.

== Conservation ==
In areas such as the Silver Valley in Northern Idaho, some spotted frog habitats have been destroyed by toxicants such as smelter byproducts. When ecosystems are contaminated with mixtures of heavy metals such as lead, zinc, cadmium, mercury, silver, and copper, this can disrupt the ability of Columbia spotted frogs to reproduce. Frogs raised in outdoor mini-ecosystems with Silver Valley soil (which contains mixtures of different metals) also showed altered predator-avoidance behaviors, decreased learning and adaptation abilities, and slower fright responses towards predator cues compared to frogs raised in mini-ecosystems with single metals. An additional effect of these metal mixtures was delayed metamorphosis. Another substance that can negatively affect Columbia spotted frogs is the piscicide rotenone, which is used to remove non-native fish species. A recent study revealed that rotenone had deadly effects on Columbia spotted frog tadpoles that had not developed into lung-breathing stages. There was a 100% mortality rate in tadpoles exposed to rotenone compared to almost no effects of the chemical on adult frogs. The lungs of adult frogs and juveniles allow them to survive rotenone in their environment.

== Reproduction ==
The Columbia spotted frog reproduces similarly to other amphibians, but with a few unique details added. Reproduction takes place in areas where emergent vegetation is present. Two of the preferred types of vegetation for reproduction are reed canary grasses and cattails. The spotted frog reproduces in the same body of water in which it lives.

Males present a chorus to the females to try to attract a mate. This song ranges from a series of clicks to long, glottal sounds. This frog has an unusual characteristic of its reproduction. The male frog arrives at the breeding grounds before the female becomes reproductively active and establishes an oviposition site.

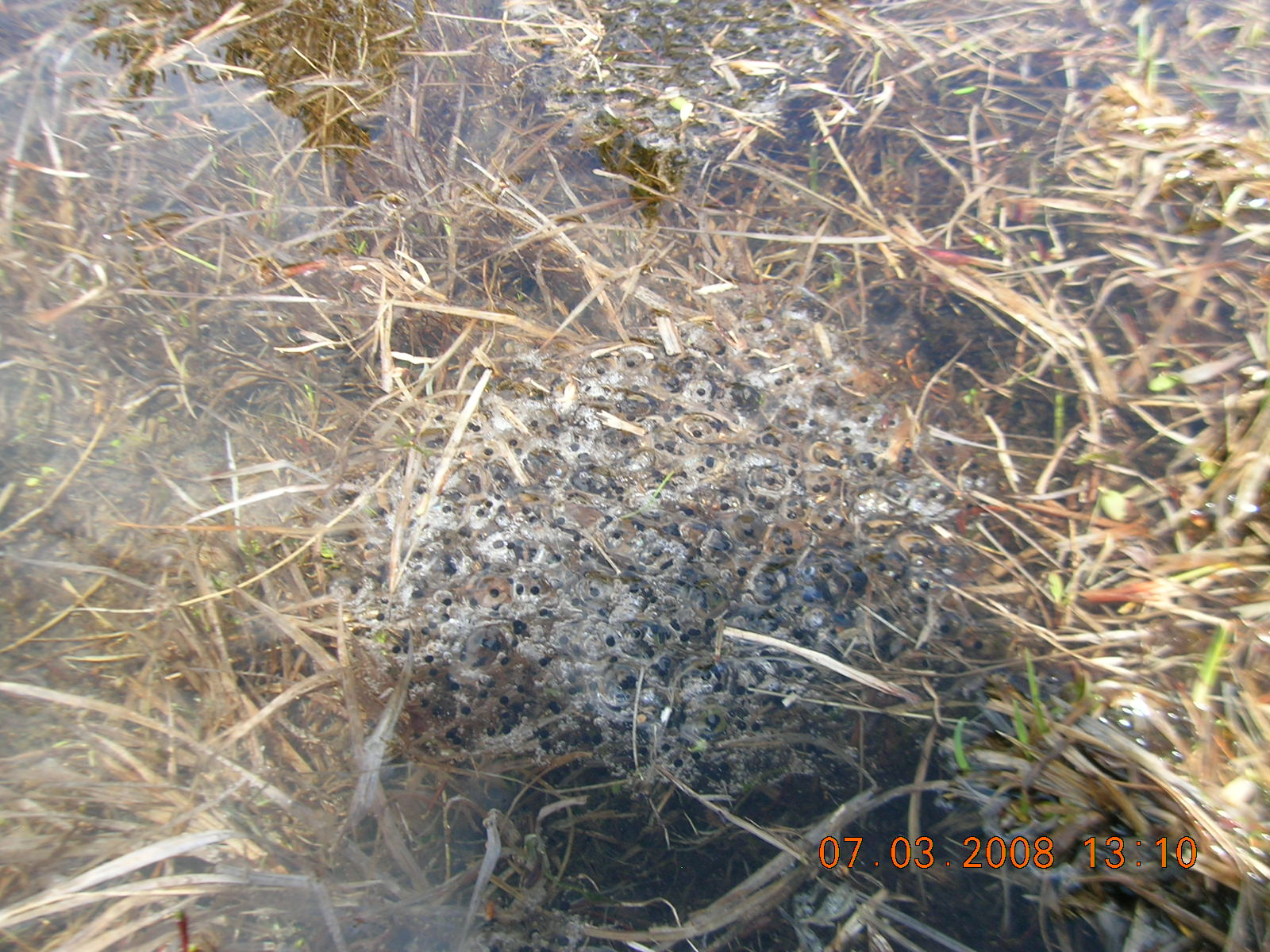
Columbia spotted frog egg mass (free-floating in a pond)

=== Female ===
Once the oviposition site is created, the female then begins to lay her eggs in shallow water, and the male fertilizes the eggs. The egg masses, fairly large in size, range up to 1300 eggs. The egg masses, once laid, absorb water and become the size of a softball. These eggs are not attached to any type of vegetation, but are left free-floating in a permanent water source. Soon after, the eggs hatch into tadpoles.

=== Breeding times ===
The Columbia spotted frog's breeding schedule depends heavily on geographical location and elevation. In British Columbia, the frog will breed during February at sea level. In areas around Utah, the frog will breed around mid-March at an elevation of about 1,395 m (4,580 ft). At areas of Wyoming, the frog will reproduce from May through June at elevations around 2,377 m (7,800 ft). The female will breed yearly at lower elevations and about every two to three years at higher elevations.

== Diet ==
This frog is opportunistic at best. It will eat a variety of insects, including grasshoppers, ants, wasps, beetles, and moths. These insects comprise more than 50% of the frog's diet. This frog will also eat seemingly unusual animals, such as crustaceans, mollusks, arthropods, and arachnids.

In addition to being an insectivore, the Columbia spotted frog will eat algae, organic debris, a variety of plants, and other smaller, water-dwelling organisms.

== Predation ==
Adults and tadpoles are commonly eaten by garter snakes. Tadpoles and metamorphosing young may be preyed on by common carp, cutthroat trout, rainbow trout, brook trout, diving beetles, water bugs, and tiger salamanders. Adults may be prey for herons, coyotes, common ravens, Brewer’s blackbirds, American kestrels, sandhill cranes, North American river otters, belted kingfishers, weasels, Clark’s nutcrackers, American badgers, and robins.
