= Dyhia Belhabib =

Environmental scientist

Dyhia Belhabib is a criminal profiler who researches crime behaviours and investigates maritime crimes. She was trained as an environmental scientist and researcher specialising in illegal fishing, conservation, artisanal fishing and food security. She is currently principal fisheries investigator for Ecotrust Canada and founder of Spyglass. Her research has investigated the link between fishing industry and the illegal drug trade and conflict between artisanal fishing, illegal fishing, climate change and international fishing subsidies. She has also advocated for decolonization and greater equity in ocean science.
