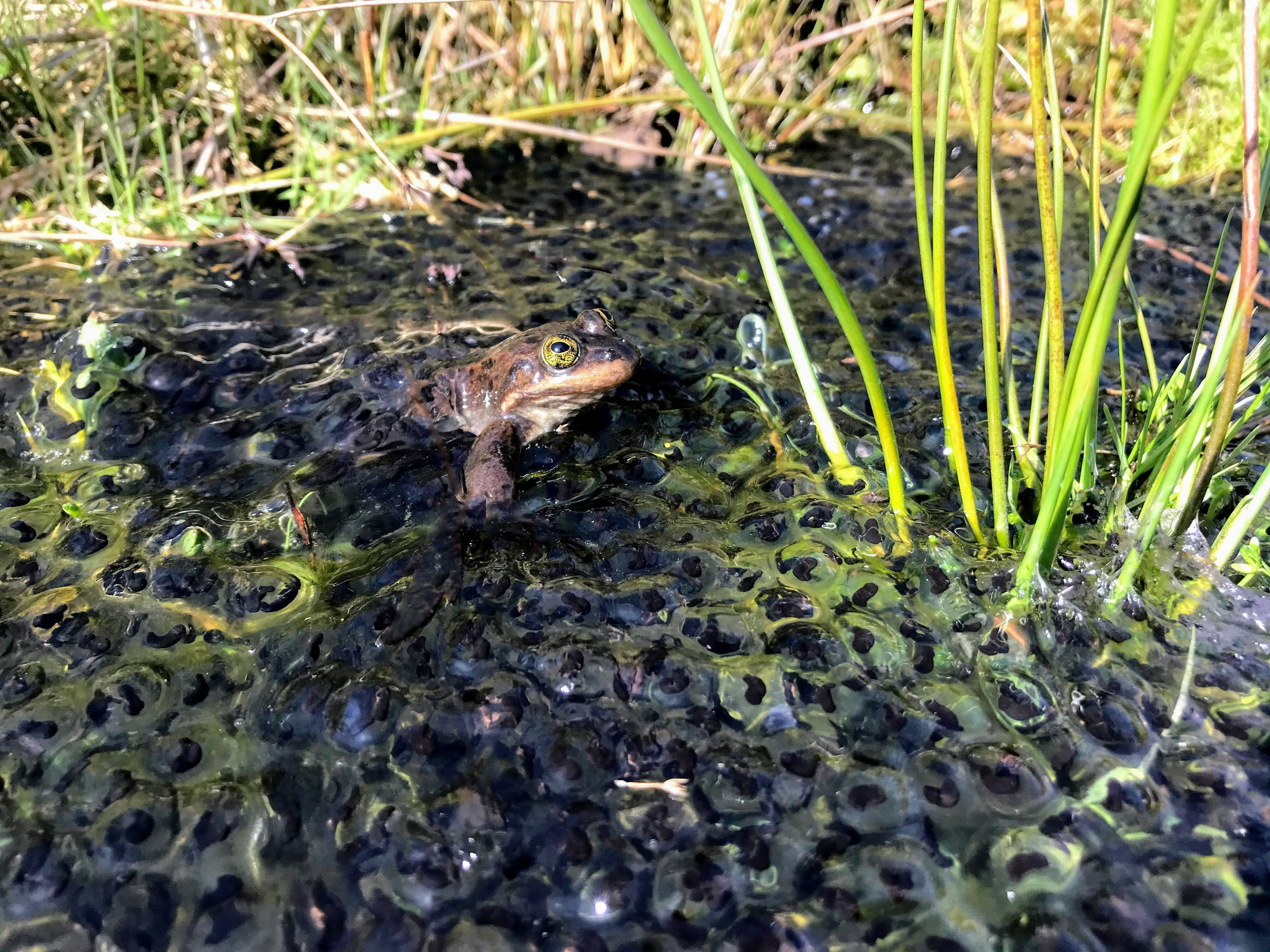
- Oregon spotted frog with egg masses

Conservation status
- Vulnerable (IUCN 3.1)

Scientific classification
- Kingdom: Animalia
- Phylum: Chordata
- Class: Amphibia
- Order: Anura
- Family: Ranidae
- Genus: Rana
- Species: R. pretiosa

Binomial name
- Rana pretiosa Baird & Girard, 1853
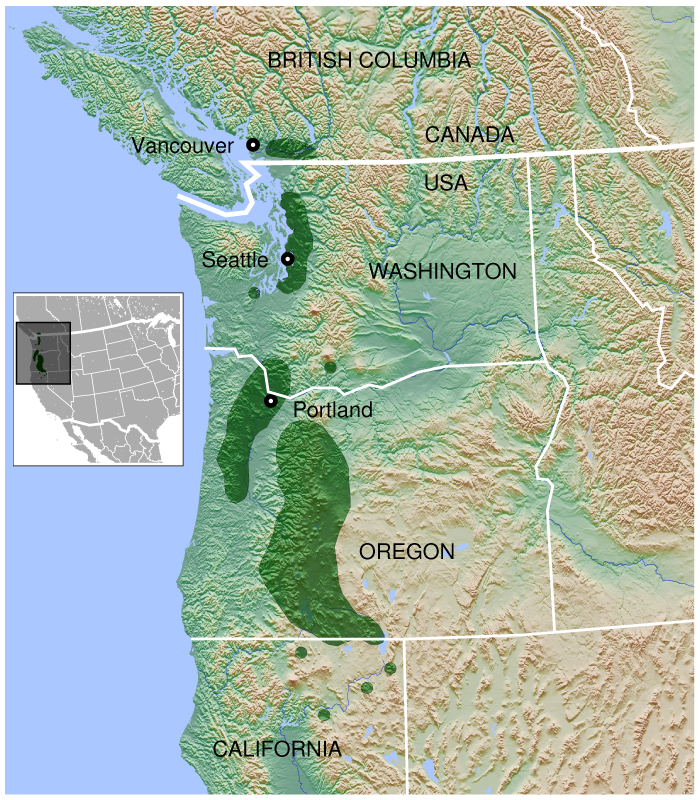
- Oregon Spotted Frog range

= Oregon spotted frog =

Species of amphibian

The Oregon spotted frog (Rana pretiosa, meaning "precious frog") is a member of the frog family Ranidae of order Anura. It is a medium-sized aquatic frog endemic to the Pacific Northwest and historically well distributed in the Puget Trough/Willamette Valley province and the Cascade Mountains of south-central Washington and Oregon. It is relatively rare within its range and is listed globally as vulnerable.

== Distribution ==
Oregon spotted frogs can be found in south-western British Columbia, Canada, south through the Puget/Willamette Valley through and the Columbia River gorge in south-central Washington to the Cascade Range at least to the Klamath Valley in Oregon, USA. They were previously found in California but have been extirpated there and have also been extirpated from much of western Oregon and Washington. They can occur at an elevation of 20–1,570 m (70–5,150 ft) asl.

In Oregon, the Oregon spotted frog's current range is Deschutes, Lane and Klamath counties. In Washington, Oregon spotted frogs occur in Thurston County.

== Description ==
As adults, the Oregon spotted frogs can range from about 4.4–10.2 cm (1.75–4 in) in snout-vent length which is the distance from the snout of the frog to the hide end/vent of the frog. Similar to most amphibians, the females tend to be larger than the males for reproductive reasons. The coloration of this species varies with age. As tadpoles, their back and tail musculature are brown and lack dark spotting, while the belly is a creamy white or aluminum color. Juveniles are usually some shade of brown, but may sometimes be olive green. Adult Oregon spotted frogs can be brown or reddish brown and tend to become increasingly red with age.

Both juvenile and adult Oregon spotted frogs have black spots with light centers present on their heads and backs which tend to become larger, darker and get an increasingly ragged-edged appearance with age. Older frogs also tend to become brick red over most of their dorsal surfaces and are frequently red on their entire abdomen forward to their chest.

Juveniles are white or cream in color with reddish pigments on their underlegs and abdomen while adults show a vivid orange-red color on their underlegs and red surface pigments on their abdomen. The dorsal lateral folds tend to be lighter in color ranging from tan to orange. The hind legs of the Oregon spotted frog are short relative to its body length and their groin tends to be uniformly gray but can sometimes be faintly mottled with gray markings and red-orange flecks. Their hind feet are fully webbed and the webbing normally extends onto the last segment of the longest toe. The Oregon spotted frog has greenish-gold colored eyes that are upturned and mostly uncovered by the eyelids when viewed from above

== Habitat ==
The Oregon spotted frog is a highly aquatic frog that seldom strays from areas of standing water. Bodies of water (i.e., wetlands, lakes and slow-moving streams) that included zones of shallow water with abundant emergent or floating aquatic plants are suitable for the Oregon spotted frogs. Mats of aquatic vegetation are used for basking on and escaping danger by diving beneath the cover of the vegetation. These habitats often provide a thin layer of unusually warm water which the frogs appear to prefer.

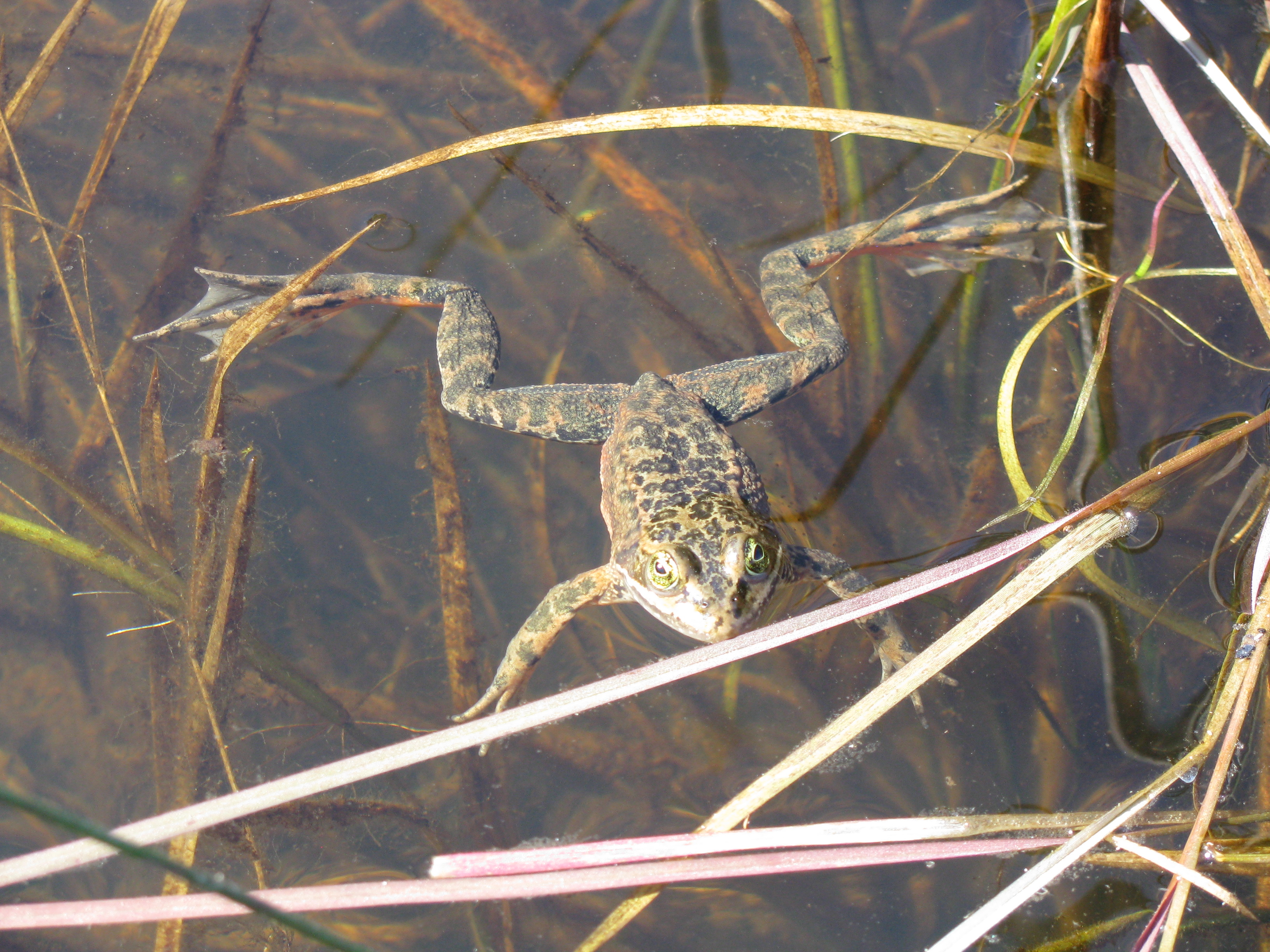
Oregon spotted frog, Rana pretiosa

== Diet ==
Adult Oregon spotted frogs feed on a variety of live animal prey, including mostly insects, while Oregon spotted frog tadpoles feed on algae, rotting vegetation, and detritus.

== Reproduction ==
The Oregon spotted frog's reproduction is strictly aquatic and their late winter breeding season is brief, less than four weeks in duration. Males call quietly during the day or night from the vicinity of traditional oviposition sites, places where females lay their eggs in communal piles. Ovipostition at selected sites is initiated when water temperatures reach 8 °C, but the timing of oviposition varies from late February-early March at lowland sites to late May-late June at montane sites in Oregon.

They breed in warm shallow water, often 5.1–30.5 cm (2–12 in) deep in areas where grasses, sedges, and rushes are usually present. Adult females reportedly breed every year and probably produce a single egg mass each year. Though egg masses are occasionally laid singly, communal oviposition sites usually comprise the majority of the annual reproductive output. These communal clusters of egg masses are often composed of between 10 and 75 individual egg masses and in British Columbia it has been recorded that each egg mass contained an average of 643 eggs. They lay their eggs in fully exposed, shallow waters that are readily warmed by the sun so that development to hatching is hastened by warm conditions. However this also increases the vulnerability of the eggs to desiccation and/or freezing.

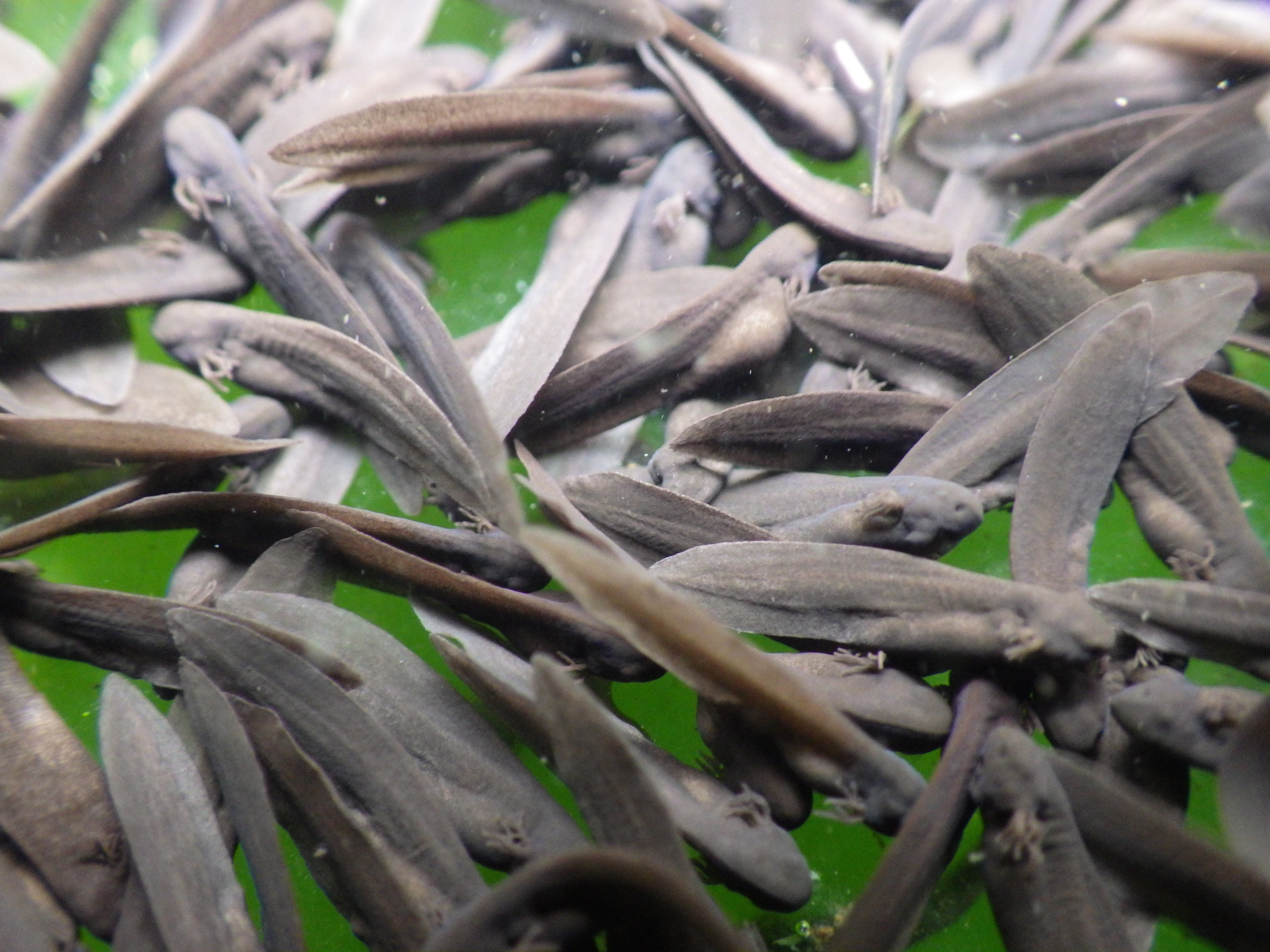
Recently hatched R. pretiosa larvae near Olympia, Washington

== Lifecycle ==
Once fertilized, the eggs of the Oregon spotted frog begin to enter the larval stage of their development very quickly. The larvae then hatch into tadpoles in 18–30 days and do not metamorphosize until 110–130 days after hatching in British Columbia, and potentially as short as 95 days in Oregon. After the transformation from a tadpole into a juvenile frog, the juveniles may remain around the breeding ponds for a period of time, although their emigration patterns are unknown. Once the Oregon spotted frog has reached adulthood, in British Columbia the males can become sexually mature within their second year and females are thought to become sexually mature in either their second or third year. In central Washington on the other hand, most males are sexually mature by the end of their first year and females become sexually mature by the middle of their second year. The longevity of the Oregon spotted frog is not well studied, but it is thought that these frogs have a relatively short life, generally living between two and five years.

== Subspecies ==
Columbia spotted frog Rana pretiosa luteiventris (Thompson, 1913) was initially described as subspecies of Rana pretiosa but has since been elevated to full species status.

== Conservation status ==
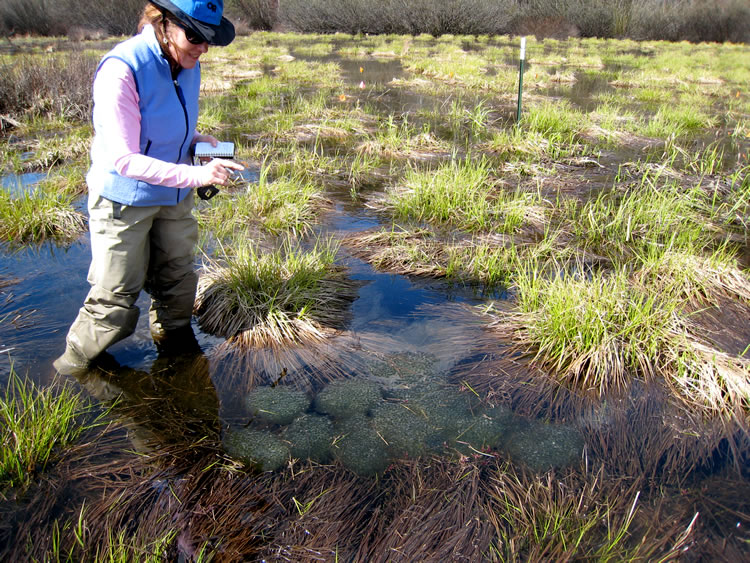
Oregon Spotted Frog Egg Mass Survey

The Oregon spotted frog is listed internationally on the IUCN Red List as vulnerable. The Oregon spotted frog was listed as threatened under the Endangered Species Act (ESA) on 29 August 2014. It is listed as endangered in Canada under the Species at Risk Act. Its decline has also been linked to areas inhabited by the introduced bullfrog and related to loss and degradation of breeding habitat such as may result from dam construction, alteration of drainage patterns, dewatering due to urban and agricultural use of water, excessive livestock grazing, and other human activities that reduce or eliminate lentic shallow water.

=== Recovery program ===
Several organizations associated with the NW Zoo and Aquarium Alliance are working on recovery projects for the Oregon spotted frog. These include the Vancouver Aquarium, the Greater Vancouver Zoo, the Woodland Park Zoo, the Washington State Department of Fish and Wildlife, Northwest Trek Wildlife Park, and Evergreen State College. School groups are also involved in enhancing habitat for the Oregon spotted frog by managing canarygrass and bullfrogs. Education of naturalists resulted in detection of new sites. On April 15th, 2024, Canada Post released a stamp with an Oregon spotted frog to attract public attention to these amphibians.

== See also ==
- Columbia spotted frog (Rana luteiventris)
