= Greater Vancouver Zoo =

- Interactive map of Greater Vancouver Zoo
- 49°05′32″N 122°29′13″W
- Date opened: August 20, 1970; 56 years ago (Note: Established in 1970 as the Vancouver Game Farm.)
- Location: 5048 264 Street, Langley, British Columbia, Canada V4W 1N7
- Land area: 49 hectares (120 acres)
- No. of species: 60
- Memberships: CAZA
- Website: www.gvzoo.com

The Greater Vancouver Zoo is a 49-hectare (120-acre) privately-run zoo located in Aldergrove, British Columbia, Canada. It was established in 1970 as the Vancouver Game Farm. Since then it has undergone two name changes, being briefly renamed as the Greater Vancouver Zoological Centre in 1995, before it adopted its present name in 1999. The zoo's mission statement is "to inspire appreciation of our ecosystems and support conservation efforts by engaging the community."

== History ==
In the late 1960s, businessman Pat Hines purchased 120 acres (49 ha) in Aldergrove, British Columbia, to construct a game farm. At first, he registered the business as the World Wide Game Farm Ltd., but on August 20, 1970, the site was opened to the public as the Vancouver Game Farm. The first animal to arrive was a llama named Dennis, who came from Mount Vernon, Washington. Soon after, animals of every size and description began to fill the newly constructed paddocks. Hines operated the game farm with his wife, Ann, other family members, and their employees. Their daughter Eleanor and her husband, Hugh Oakes, eventually took over management of the facility until 1991, when it was sold.

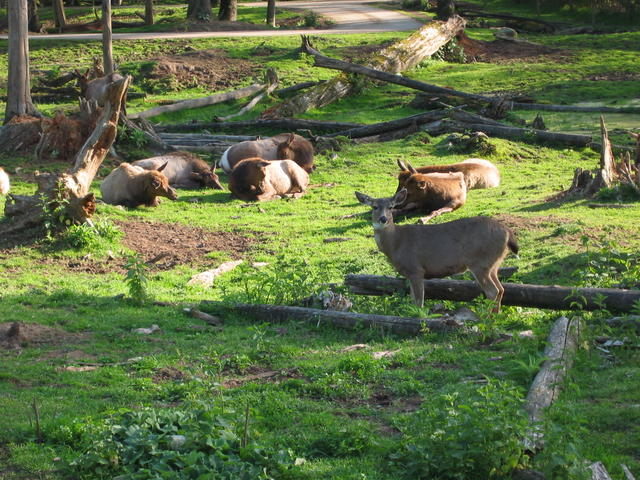
A mixed herd of elk and white-tailed deer at the zoo.

Under new ownership, the game farm underwent many changes, including a new name. In 1995, it was renamed the Greater Vancouver Zoological Centre, since it is part of the Greater Vancouver area rather than being a part of Vancouver. Improvements included the construction of new animal enclosures, 2 ft (610 mm) narrow-gauge miniature train rides, a picnic park with covered gazebos and barbecues, expanded landscaping, a remodeled entrance, more parking spaces, and interpretive and educational programs and activities. In 1998, the North American Wilds exhibit opened, providing a narrative safari bus ride for visitors through one area where carnivores like black bears, coyotes, and Vancouver Island wolves lived together; and into another habitat where grazers like the Roosevelt elk, black-tailed deer, and North American plains bison roamed.

In 1999, the facility went through another ownership change and was eventually renamed the Greater Vancouver Zoo. During this period, the zoo focused more towards conservation and to building up its educational programs.

In 2000, the Greater Vancouver Zoo joined the Oregon Spotted Frog Recovery Program. At the time, the frog was the only species to receive an "emergency listing" as an endangered species in Canada. The zoo is still involved with this program, releasing frogs into the wild after they are weighed, measured, and tagged. Many animals have been rescued over the years and eventually released back into the wild, but some animals like Shadow, a grizzly bear, cannot be returned; she had been abandoned as a young cub and was not able to learn the skills needed to survive in the wild. In addition, the majority of the zoo's reptiles, exotic birds, various cat species, and many others were taken in for numerous reasons, such as being rescued from the illegal pet trade or after being abandoned as pets.

=== 21st century ===
New educational programs were introduced by the zoo. In 2005, the "Radical Raptor Birds of Prey" show was created, in which eagles, owls, hawks, and falcons performed free flying presentations at the amphitheatre. Since then, the zoo has introduced a one-week summer camp program for children ages 10–14 to handle and learn about the many birds of prey species since 2007. In 2006, the zoo opened its indoor Animalasium – Educational Training Centre to teach the public about conservation and education for animals and their environments. In addition, the centre is also used for various other functions, such as birthday parties, group sessions and guest speaker events. The zoo offers educational walking tours for school groups that is based on a B.C. Ministry of Education curriculum.

The new owners also completed building new enclosures for the grizzly bear, the Arctic wolf, the camels, the mountain sheep, and the hippopotamus, while making improvements to the giraffe enclosure. On August 23, 2008, the zoo introduced a pair of muskox to their new 32,000 sq ft (3,000 m^{2}) enclosure, which with the Arctic wolf, Arctic fox, reindeer, and emperor, and snow goose enclosures, completes their new Arctic Section exhibit.

The zoo's new general manager, Serge Lussier, announced expansive plans for a more immersive "zoo of the future" in spring 2020, including several multi-million dollar projects expected to be completed over the course of the next several years. This included plans to re-structure over half of its area into a sprawling, multi-species savannah landscape, as well as an engaging area for big cats, and an observation walkway. However, despite seeing record-breaking summer attendance owing to its status as an outdoor attraction, progress was slowed due to the COVID-19 pandemic. Despite the setbacks, the zoo underwent extensive changes; renovations were made on many of the zoo's habitats and fences, including its giraffe viewing platform, and a larger front entrance was constructed along with a new gift shop and guest services area. Among the zoo's new animals are three grizzly bear cubs orphaned in the wild in Alberta.

In the summer of 2021, the zoo opened a new walk-through exhibit, Mesozoic Adventure, a Jurassic Park-esque area featuring a dozen life-sized animatronic dinosaurs.

On July 1st, 2023, the zoo opened a second walk-through exhibit, Wallaby Walkthrough. The experience consists of a small looped trail that runs through a portion of a multi-species enclosure, featuring red-necked wallabies, red kangaroos and an emu.

== Animals ==
As of May 2026, the Greater Vancouver Zoo has 49 different species on public display.

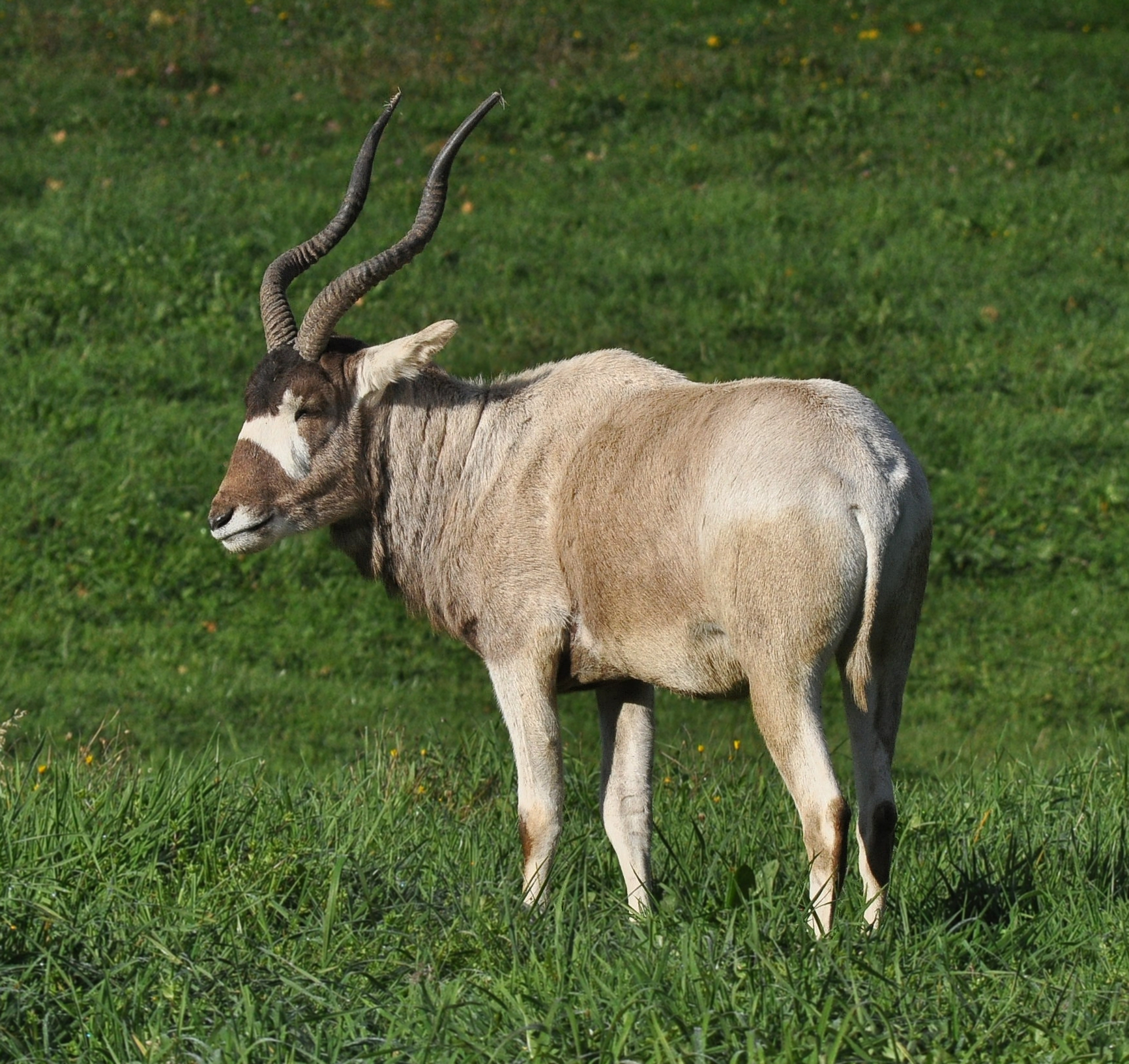
An addax, one of two endangered species of antelope on display at the zoo.

=== Mammals ===
- Addax (critically endangered)
- African lion (vulnerable)
- Alpaca (domestic)
- American black bear (least concern)
- Ankole-Watusi (domestic)
- Bighorn sheep (least concern)
- Blue wildebeest (least concern)
- Burchell's zebra
- Capybara (least concern)
- Caribou (vulnerable)
- Cheetah (vulnerable)
- Common eland (least concern)
- Cougar (least concern)
- Domestic pig (least concern)
- Black burro (least concern)
- Grant's zebra
- Gray wolf (least concern)
- Grizzly bear (least concern)
- Hippopotamus (vulnerable)
- Jaguar (near threatened)
- Miniature horse (least concern)
- Mountain goat (least concern)
- Nilgai (least concern)
- Patagonian mara (near threatened)
- Persian onager (endangered)
- Plains bison (near threatened)
- Red fox (least concern)
- Red kangaroo (least concern)
- Red-necked wallaby (least concern)
- Red panda (endangered)
- Red river hog (least concern)
- Ring-tailed lemur (endangered)
- Roosevelt elk (least concern)
- Rothschild's giraffe (endangered)
- Scimitar-horned oryx (endangered)
- Siberian tiger (endangered)
- Sika deer (least concern)
- Snow leopard (vulnerable)
- Southern white rhinoceros (near threatened)
- Vietnamese pot-bellied pig (domestic)
- Waterbuck (least concern)
- White-tailed deer (least concern)
- Wood bison (threatened)

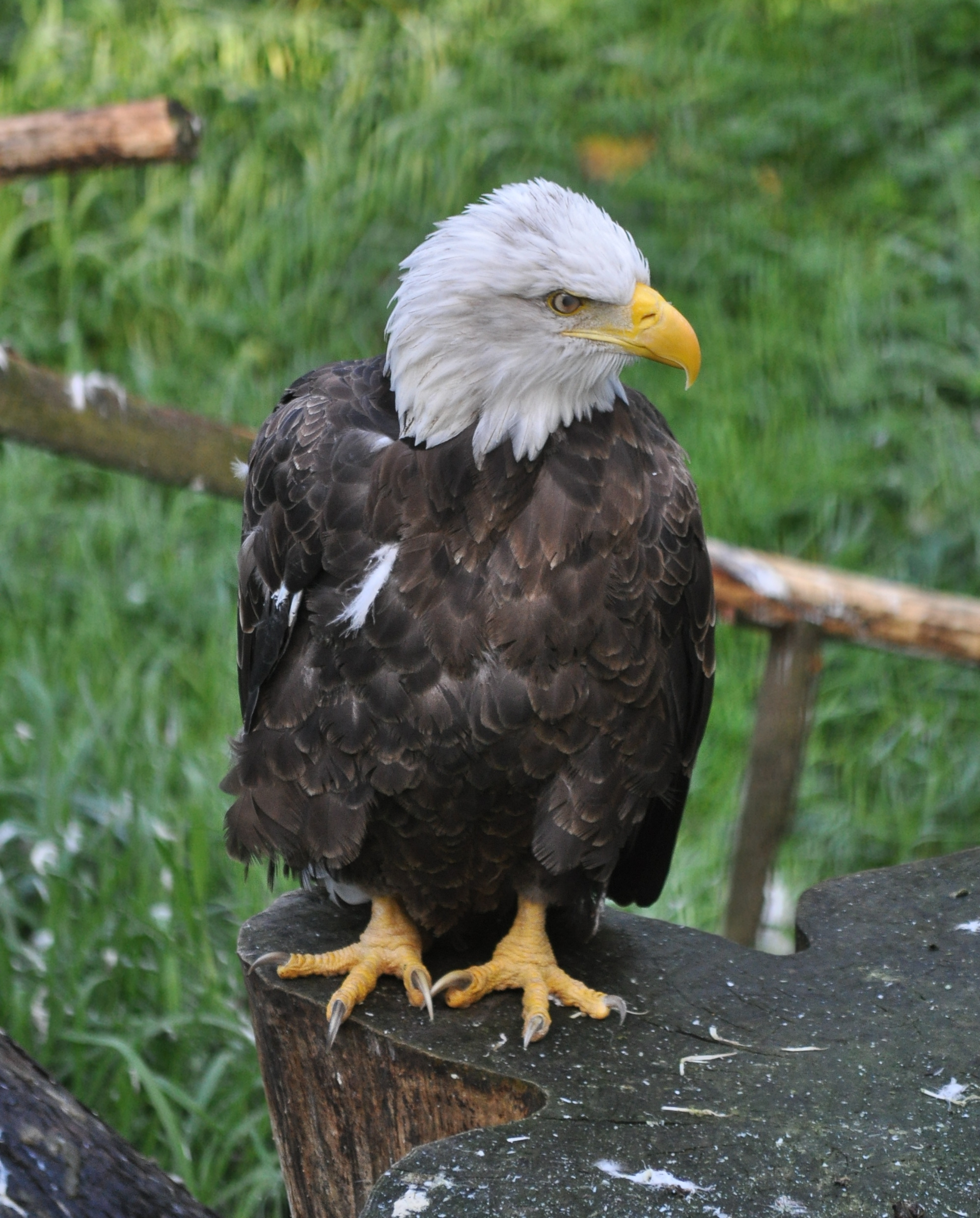
A bald eagle.

=== Birds ===
- American flamingo (least concern)
- Bald eagle (least concern)
- Blue-and-gold macaw (least concern)
- Chilean flamingo (near threatened)
- Common ostrich (least concern)
- Emu (least concern)
- Indian Peafowl (least concern)

=== Reptiles and amphibians ===
- African spurred tortoise (vulnerable)
- Ball python (least concern)
- Gopher snake (least concern)
- Hognose snake (least concern)
- Oregon spotted frog (vulnerable)
- Spur-thighed tortoise (least concern)
- Western painted turtle (vulnerable)
- White's tree frog (least concern)

=== Insects ===
- Darkling beetle (least concern)
- Madagascar hissing cockroach (least concern)
- Taylor's checkerspot butterfly (endangered)

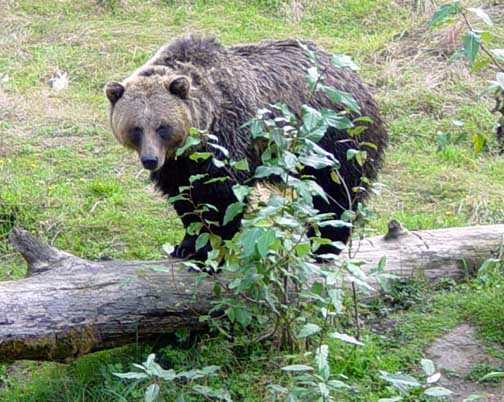
'Shadow', the zoo's senior female grizzly bear.

=== Notable animals (past and present) ===
- Tina, an Asian elephant (1970–2004)
- Shadow, a grizzly bear b. 1999
- Hazina, a Common hippo b. 2003
- Boomer, an African lion (2007–2026)
- Henry, Huggy and Scout, grizzly bear cubs b. 2020
- Maple and Mei Mei, red pandas b. 2022

== Conservation ==
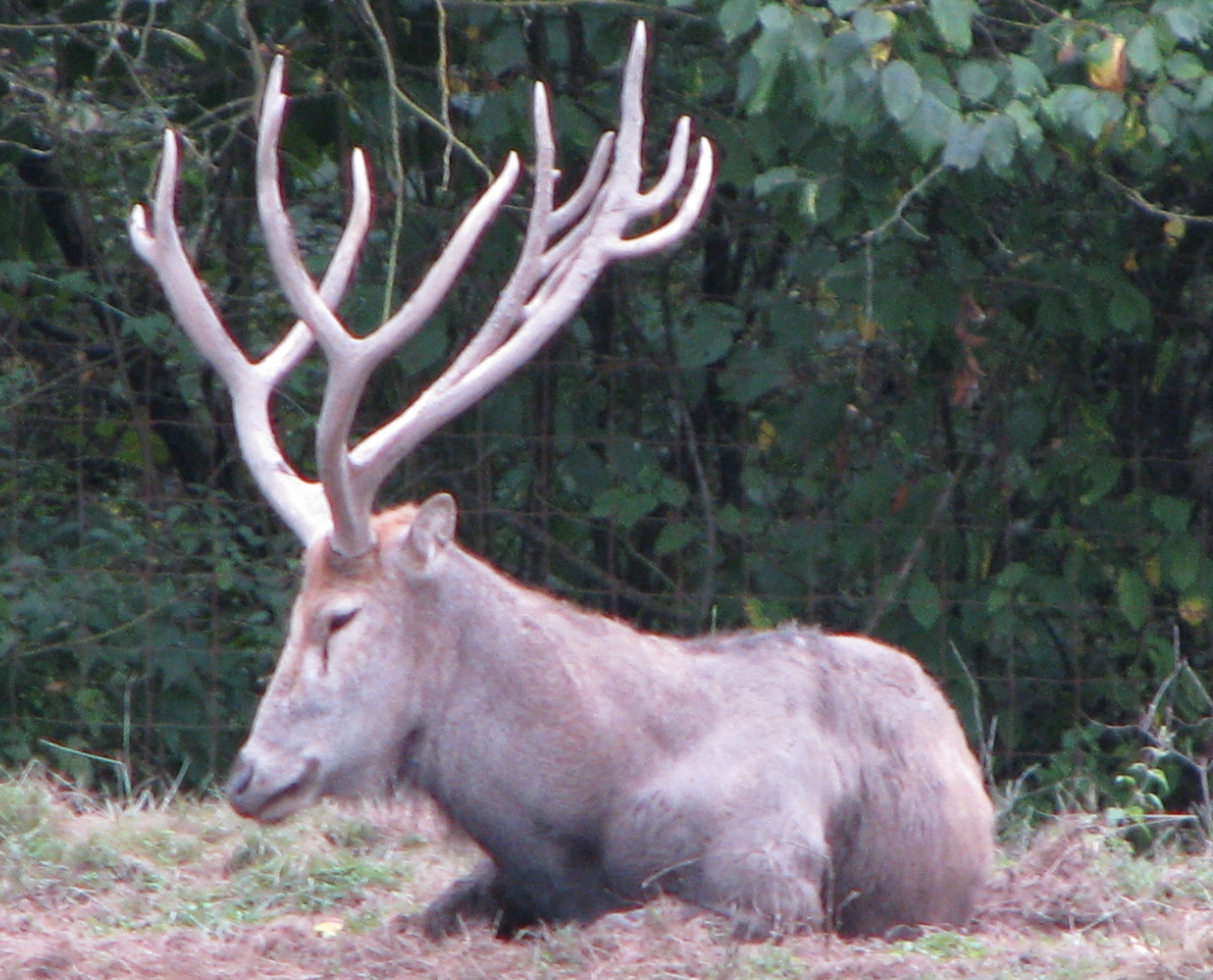
A Père David's deer buck on display in 2007. As of 2022, the zoo no longer features this species.

The Greater Vancouver Zoo participates in both local and global conservation efforts. The zoo has successfully bred exotic, endangered species like addax and Père David's deer, and was the first zoo in western Canada to breed red pandas.

In collaboration with Wildlife Preservation Canada, the zoo has supported the captive breeding and release of three endangered species native to British Columbia, these being the Oregon spotted frog, Taylor’s checkerspot butterfly and Western painted turtle. For their work with the Oregon spotted frog, the zoo was given the Colonel G.D. Dailley Award, which symbolises and celebrates the "achievement in ex-situ propagation and management programs that contribute to the long-term survival of animal species or populations."

The zoo also participates in the Salmon River Restoration Program, a stewardship program designed to support the Salmon River tributary, which passes through the property.

== Controversies ==
In 1997, two reports by Zoocheck Canada and UK veterinarian Samantha Lindley called on the Greater Vancouver Zoo to improve conditions for the animals it holds, such as rhinoceros and big cats. By 2003, few improvements had been made.

On May 31, 2006, the Crown Counsel of British Columbia laid formal charges against the Greater Vancouver Zoo, in accordance with the Prevention of Cruelty to Animals Act, for failing to provide adequate facilities for a baby hippo acquired in October 2004. This was the first case of a major Canadian zoo being charged with cruelty to animals. However, in January 2007, the case was stayed, as crown counsel believed, with the opening of a new habitat for hippos, that it was no longer in the public interest. This was not seen as vindication for the Greater Vancouver Zoo nor a statement that charges were unjustified. The zoo eventually lost its Canadian Association of Zoos and Aquariums accreditation over this incident for two years.

In May 2008, an individual broke into the zoo when it was closed, entered the spider monkey enclosure, killed Jocko (the male monkey), and kidnapped Mia (the female monkey). The case is still unsolved and there is currently a $3,000 reward for Mia's safe return.

In June 2008, the zoo made headlines when Skye, a female golden eagle, was killed by a lioness after landing in the lion enclosure, following a run-in with a murder of crows. Two months after that incident, a four-year-old boy was landed on by a Harris's hawk when he volunteered in the Radical Raptors Birds of Prey show. According to the zoo's spokesperson, the hawk mistook the boy's head for a perch. After the incident, the zoo removed Harris's hawks from the bird show and put a stop to audience participation.

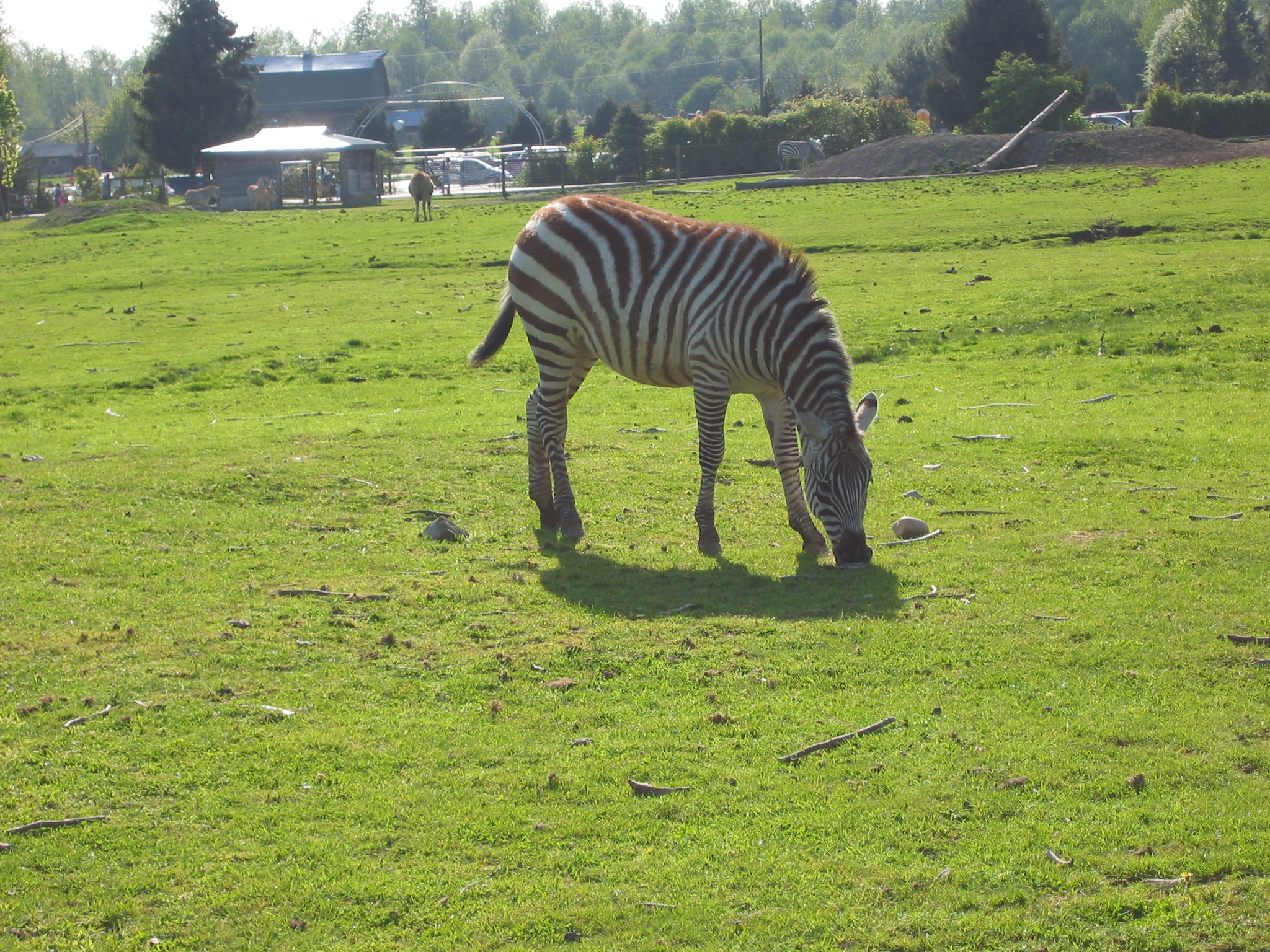
A plains zebra grazing in the zoo's savannah exhibit.

On April 20, 2009, it was reported that four zebras had died in early March, shortly after two African buffalo were introduced to their enclosure. The zoo did not make the incident public at the time. A spokesperson for the Vancouver Humane Society stated that the zebras were between 5 and 15 years old, and probably died from exertional myopathy, a muscle disease causing damage to muscle tissues which is caused by physiological changes (often extreme exertion, struggle, or stress). The spokesperson also stated that African buffalo are extremely dangerous and although the two species co-exist in the wild, they should not have been placed together in an enclosed space. The British Columbia Society for the Prevention of Cruelty to Animals has launched an investigation of the incident, while the Vancouver Humane Society would ask the Canadian Association of Zoos and Aquariums to investigate the incident and review the zoo's accreditation. The zoo replaced the dead animals with two new zebras.

Two giraffes died within days of each other in November 2011—23-year-old Eleah and her offspring, three-year-old Amryn, were found deceased inside the giraffe barn. Just a year later on November 4, 2012, 12-year-old giraffe Jafari, the sire of Amryn, was also found dead inside the barn.

A 2-year-old girl was injured by one of the zoo's three black bears on August 5, 2019, after she ventured past a guard rail and stuck her arm through the enclosure's fence. The child was airlifted to hospital and treated for extensive injuries to her arm, including a fracture and the loss of a fingertip.

On July 21, 2020, photos of an emaciated moose cow, known as Oakleaf, were posted to social media, prompting backlash from the general public and the Vancouver Humane Society, who called for an investigation into the incident. Shortly thereafter it was announced the zoo had euthanised the eight-year-old moose on July 22, 2020, due to her continually deteriorating health.

According to a report by WorkSafeBC, a keeper was injured by one of the zoo's jaguars during a feeding session on December 13, 2021, wherein the feline bit the zookeeper's hand.

On August 16, 2022, a clipped hole was discovered in the fence surrounding the habitat containing nine adult grey wolves and six cubs, leading to the wolves escaping and two leaving the zoo grounds. Two wolves were recovered by the British Columbia Conservation Officer Service by a creek, and another by a veterinarian in the dinosaur exhibit through the use of dart guns. Chia, a three-year old female that had left zoo property, was hit by a car and found dead on the roadside. After three days of searching, the missing one-year old adult female Tempest was safely returned to the zoo.
