= Ecotrust =

U.S. non-profit organization

- Formation: 1991; 35 years ago
- Type: Nonprofit
- Tax ID no.: 93-1050144
- Legal status: 501(c)(3)
- Headquarters: Portland, Oregon
- Location: United States
- Executive Director: Ronda Rutledge
- Board of directors: Afton Walsh; Alexandria McBride; Antone Minthorn; Bobbie Conner; Cat Goughnour; David Chen; Elise Lufkin; Gun Denhart; Jaime Arredondo; Jean Johnson; Lisa Mensah; Robert Friedman; Ron Grzywinski
- Website: https://ecotrust.org/

Ecotrust is a nonprofit organization based in Portland, Oregon, working to create social, economic, and environmental benefits.

== History and programs ==
Ecotrust was founded in 1991 by Spencer Beebe, who brought his conservation experience in the tropical rain forests of Central and South America home to North America's temperate rain forests. Prior to Ecotrust, Beebe was president of the Nature Conservancy International Program and founding president of Conservation International.

Ecotrust's advisors have included urbanist Jane Jacobs, ecological economist and steady-state theorist Herman Daly, forestry scientist Jerry Franklin, and counterculture icon Stewart Brand. In 2003, ecologist Peter Warshall summarized the organization's activities with the statement, "Ecotrust is about designing a future."

Ecotrust began by surveying temperate rain forests as a distinct ecoregion, an analysis that led the organization to identify British Columbia's Kitlope River as the largest intact temperate rain forest watershed in the world. Beebe and others from Ecotrust visited the region and engaged the Haisla First Nation, whose traditional territory included the Kitlope. The organization supported the Haisla in launching a Rediscovery Program for cultural education and, four years later, in securing provincial government recognition for over 750,000 acres (3,000 km^{2}) of temperate rain forest as Huchsduwachsdu Nuyem Jees (the Kitlope Heritage Conservancy Protected Area).

A source of inspiration for the organization has been Wendell Berry's quote, "The answers, if they are to come, and if they are to work, must be developed in the presence of the user on the land; they must be developed to some degree by the user on the land." In addition to Ecotrust's work in the Kitlope region, the organization's support of local leadership and communities has included Pribilof Islands, Alaska; Prince William Sound / Copper River, Alaska; Clayoquot Sound, British Columbia; Willapa Bay, Washington; and the Klamath region, Oregon / California.

In 1992, seeking to find greater financial resources for entrepreneurial efforts in these communities, Ecotrust initiated discussions with ShoreBank Corporation, the Chicago-based leader in community development banking. In 1995, the two partnered in founding ShoreBank Enterprise (now ShoreBank Enterprise Cascadia), a non-profit community development financial institution (CDFI), and in 1997 ShoreBank Pacific, the nation's first environmental bank.

In 1994, Spencer Beebe realized that he needed a Canadian partner organization and asked one of his board members, Jacqueline Koerner, to take the lead on founding Ecotrust Canada, an independent affiliate, based in Vancouver, British Columbia which received charitable status in 1995 and has operated ever since, receiving in 2019 the recognition as one of the top 10 environmental charities in Canada. The first President of Ecotrust Canada was journalist Ian Gill who left in 2010 to establish another spin off organisation Ecotrust Australia, that shut down operations after two years in 2012.

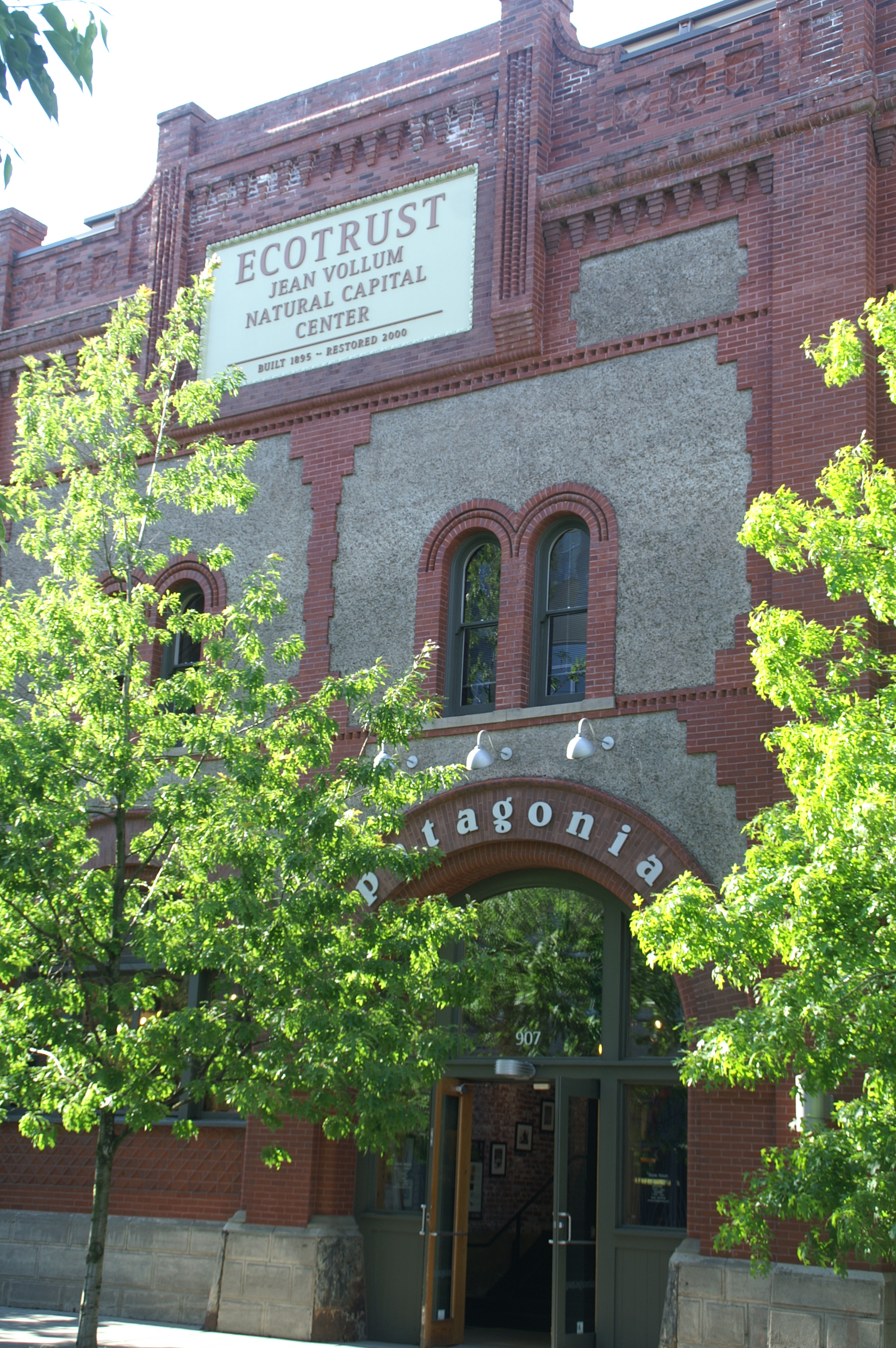
Ecotrust is headquartered in the LEED-certified Natural Capital Center, in Portland.

Another emphasis for Ecotrust has been an effort to characterize the region, based on its human / nature interrelationships. Ecotrust published the first distribution and status maps of temperate rain forests and Pacific salmon of North America, as well as a series of books that include The Rain Forests of Home: Profile of a North American Bioregion and Salmon Nation: People, Fish and Our Common Home.

Later in the 1990s, with advice from board member Jane Jacobs, Ecotrust expanded its attention to urban markets. The organization redeveloped a Portland warehouse into the Jean Vollum Natural Capital Center, the first historic restoration in the country to earn a Leadership in Environmental and Energy Design (LEED) gold award, and launched what has become one of the nation's leading programs for sustainable food and farming.

Recent extensions of Ecotrust's work include: honoring native leaders through the Buffett Award for Indigenous Leadership; promoting regional economies through a series of cartoon-filled newspaper inserts in the Portland and San Francisco dailies and weeklies; creating decision support tools for ecosystem-based management; launching Ecotrust Forests LLC, a private equity fund to manage forestland for long-term regional health, as well as financial returns; and bolstering bioregional identity through the idea of Salmon Nation.

"The line between for- and nonprofit is getting blurry", said environmentalist and author Paul Hawken in 2007. Ecotrust has established an unusual affiliation of for- and nonprofit entities that work at the intersection of natural, social and economic capital.
