= Escarpment Biosphere Conservancy =

Escarpment Biosphere Conservancy, Inc.
- Formation: 1997; 29 years ago
- Headquarters: Toronto, ON, Canada
- Executive Director and Founding Member: Robert E. Barnett
- Website: www.escarpment.ca

The Escarpment Biosphere Conservancy (EBC) is an environmental NGO, a registered environmental charity, and a qualified recipient to receive ecological gifts through the eco-gifts program of Environment and Climate Change Canada (Canada). It is the largest Ontario-focused land trust, with over 190 nature reserves as of January 2021.

== History ==
In 1997, EBC's founding directors left the Bruce Trail Association to start a new organization, focused on the acquisition of new nature reserves in Ontario. EBC's main mission is to establish, maintain and manage a system of nature reserves in the area of the Niagara Escarpment. Its signature reserve is the 347-acre (140 ha) Cup and Saucer Trail on Manitoulin Island, acquired by EBC in 2000.

EBC is a member of the Ontario Land Trust Alliance.

EBC's conservation efforts help Canada meet its obligations under the 2015 Convention on Biological Diversity. Its forest and peat bog preserves also sequester carbon, recognized as an important tool to limit warming due to climate change.

== Recognition ==
In 2011, EBC was recognized by the North American Native Plant Society, with the Founders Conservation Award, for creating 102 nature reserves.

== Projects ==
In 2019, EBC purchased a 235-acre (95 ha) parcel of land, known as "Willisville Mountain" near Sudbury.

In 2021, EBC acquired the Trout's Hollow as a nature reserve (near Meaford, Ontario), where John Muir lived, worked, and explored nature during his time in Ontario between 1864 and 1866.

In 2021, EBC conditionally offered to purchase nearly 2,000 acres (810 ha) in the La Cloche Hills.
