= Ian Gill =

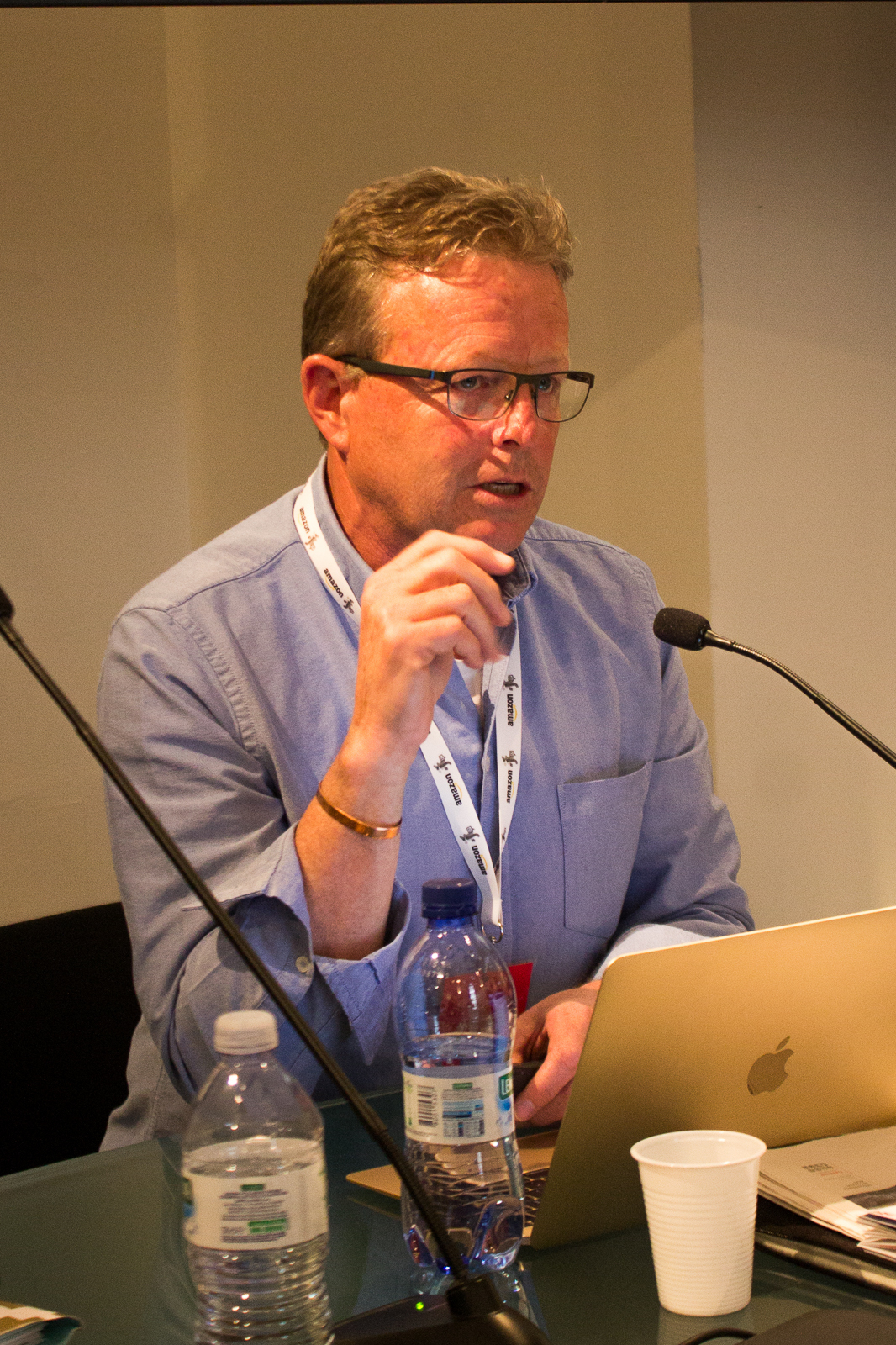
- Born: 1955

Ian Gill is an Australian-Canadian writer, documentary filmmaker, and social entrepreneur. He serves as a director of Vancouver Writers Fest literary festival.

== Career ==
He worked as a reporter for the Canadian Broadcasting Corporation.

Gill served as president and founder of Ecotrust Canada from 1994 to 2010. In 2010 he was appointed founding executive director of Ecotrust Australia. Gill served for over five years as a director of Vancity credit union.

He writes for publications in Canada and North America including The Tyee, Alberta Views, and Policy Options.

== Works ==
=== Books ===
- Hiking on the Edge: Canada's West Coast Trail (1995)
- Haida Gwaii: Journeys Through the Queen Charlotte Islands (1997)
- All That We Say Is Ours: Guujaaw and the Reawakening of the Haida Nation (2009) (Shortlisted for BC Book Prize and nominated for the Roderick Haig-Brown Regional Book Prize)
- No News Is Bad News: Canada's Media Collapse - and What Comes Next (2016)

=== Film ===
- Confessions of an Innocent Man (writer) (2007), winner of Gemini-award for Best Biography

Other selected titles include:

- Transplant Tourism (CBC) (writer) 2003
- The Boys of Buchenwald (History Television) (writer) 2002
- To Love, Honour and Obey (CTV) 2001
- The Life and Times of Dr. Henry Morgentaler (CBC) 1999
- The Dealmaker: The Life and Times of Jimmy Pattison (CBC) 1998
- The Life and Times of David Suzuki (CBC) 1998
- Mordecai: The Life and Times of Mordecai Richler (CBC) 1997
- Whisky Man: Inside the Dynasty of Samuel Bronfman (CBC) 1996
