= Natural Capital Center =

Building in Portland, Oregon, U.S.

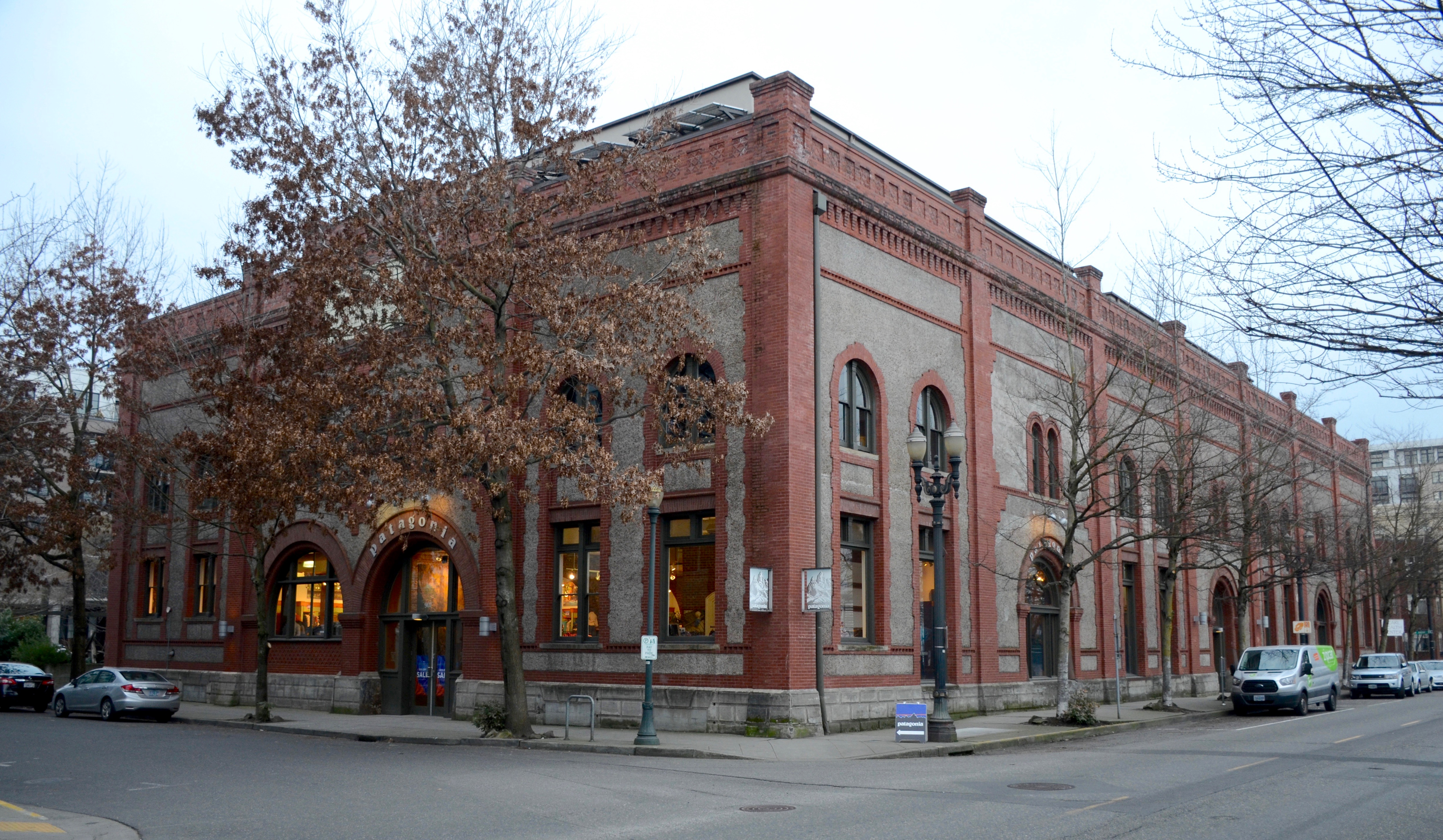
- Viewed from the southeast in 2017

- Location within Portland, Oregon
- Former names: McCraken Company Building; Central Truck Terminal (or Portland Truck Terminal)
- Alternative names: Ecotrust Building

General information
- Type: Multiuse
- Architectural style: Romanesque
- Location: 721 NW 9th Avenue; Portland, Oregon
- Coordinates: 45.52834°N 122.68061°W
- Construction started: 1895
- Completed: 1896
- Renovated: 1999–2001
- Renovation cost: $12.4 million
- Owner: Ecotrust Properties, LLC

Technical details
- Floor count: 3
- Floor area: 70,000 sq ft (6,500 m^{2})

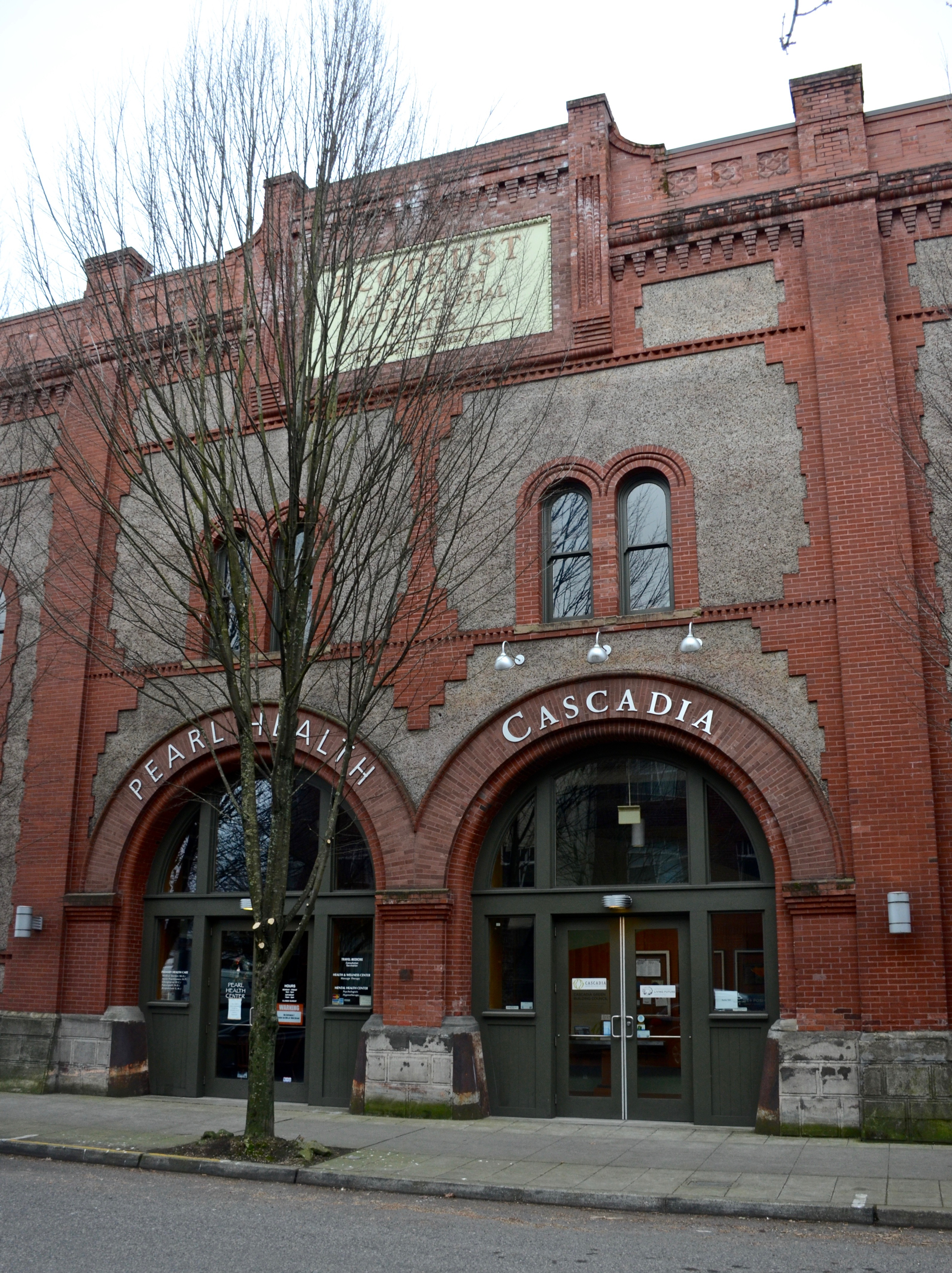
The building's north end

The Natural Capital Center, formally known as the Jean Vollum Natural Capital Center and informally as the Ecotrust Building, is a notable example of green building in Portland, Oregon, United States. It was the first historic redevelopment in the U.S. to receive a gold-level Leadership in Energy and Environmental Design (LEED) award from the U.S. Green Building Council. The building houses a mix of public and private, nonprofit and for-profit tenants.

== History and redevelopment ==
The timber and brick structure that is now the Natural Capital Center was built in 1895 as a warehouse for the J. McCraken Company, who used it until 1902 and continued to own it for some years thereafter. The building's recessed rounded-arch entry, arched window openings and massive heft exemplify the Romanesque style. Located between two railroad freight yards, the McCraken wholesale company distributed Monterey sand, Tenino sandstone and other building supplies. In 1929, the building became the Portland Truck Terminal, a freight terminal used by around 20 trucking companies. Then from 1941 to 1997 it housed the Rapid Transfer & Storage Company.

In 1998, Ecotrust, a nonprofit conservation organization, purchased the building with a donation from then board member Jean Vollum. Redevelopment of the 70,000-square-foot (6,500 m^{2}) building cost $12.4 million and was completed in September 2001. The idea that a conservation organization would shift focus from protecting forests and watersheds to participating in urban renewal was an unusual and controversial one. Ecotrust board member Jane Jacobs and Ecotrust council member Stewart Brand were notable supporters of the plan.

Re-opened to the public in 2001, the building was named the Natural Capital Center to reflect the ideas in ecological economics. The Natural Capital Center was the first LEED gold-certified building in the Pacific Northwest. The building has a mix of "green" tenants, including Patagonia, Hot Lips Pizza, ShoreBank Pacific, and Portfolio 21. The City of Portland's Office of Sustainable Development, created in 2001, was originally located in the Natural Capital Center, occupying 5,000 ft^{2} (460 m^{2}) in the building. It moved out in 2009, after being merged with the City's Planning Bureau and renamed the Bureau of Planning and Sustainability.

The Natural Capital Center has been cited as an inspiration for the Green Exchange in Chicago, which was built in 2007.

== Green building features ==
As a reused building, energy was conserved during its construction by manufacturing significantly fewer materials. Two-thirds of the new wood used in the Natural Capital Center was Forest Stewardship Council (FSC) certified. The building has also included rubber flooring from post-consumer recycled rubber tires.

An annex to the original building was deconstructed, and throughout the redevelopment, 98% of all debris was reused, recycled or reclaimed.

The Natural Capital Center received a LEED rating of 41 out of 69 possible points.
