= Ecotrust Canada =

Charity in British Columbia, Canada

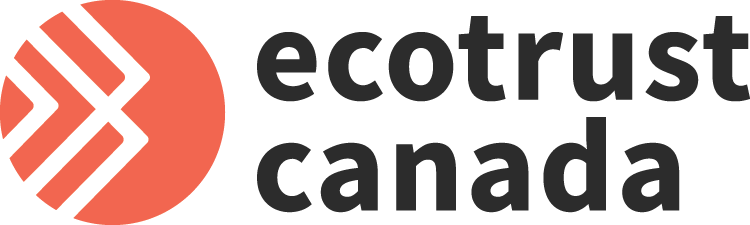
- Founded: 1995
- Founder: Ian Gill
- Type: Non-profit charity
- Registration no.: 89474 9969 RR0001
- Purpose: Building resilient localized economies in remote, rural, and Indigenous communities
- Locations: Vancouver, British Columbia; Prince Rupert, British Columbia
- Region served: Canada
- Key people: Chuck Rumsey, President
- Website: www.ecotrust.ca

Ecotrust Canada is a Canadian charity with offices in Vancouver and Prince Rupert, BC.

== History ==
In 1991, Ecotrust, an American charity based in Portland, Oregon, was established with the purpose of developing a conservation-based economy in the Pacific Northwest. Founder Spencer Beebe set out to work with Indigenous people in the world's largest intact coastal temperate rainforest, located in northwestern BC. He soon realized that he needed a Canadian partner organization and, in 1994, asked one of his Canadian Ecotrust board members, Jacqueline Koerner, to take the lead on founding Ecotrust Canada. Jacqueline became Founding Chair; soon environmental journalist, Ian Gill, became the organization's first executive director. In 1995, Ecotrust Canada received charitable status, marking the beginning of its journey toward building resilient economies in rural, remote, and Indigenous communities.

In 2010, Ian Gill left his position as President of Ecotrust Canada to assume the role of CEO of the newly founded Ecotrust Australia, operated as a separate yet affiliated organization. Ecotrust Australia closed in 2012.

== Recognition ==
In 2019, MoneySense graded Ecotrust Canada as a top 10 environmental charity in Canada. In 2013, Charity Intelligence Canada selected Ecotrust Canada as one of the top 7 environmental charities in Canada. Ecotrust Canada was also selected by the Coady International Institute at St. Francis Xavier University as one of 11 case studies from Canada and the US demonstrating successful citizen-led sustainable change.

Former President, Brenda Kuecks, received a Clean50 Award in 2013 for her work in promoting sustainable development and clean capitalism in Canada. In 2008, she received a BC Community Achievement Award from Premier Gordon Campbell.

In 2008, Ecotrust Canada received a Special Achievement in GIS award from ESRI in recognition of the organization's work with the Aboriginal Mapping Network. It previously won the award in 2004 for work with the Council of the Haida Nation to establish the Haida Mapping Office.

== See also ==
- Ecotrust
- Dyhia Belhabib
