= Wildlife Preservation Canada =

Wildlife Preservation Canada is a non-profit, non-governmental environmental organization with a mission to save animal species at risk from extinction in Canada by providing direct, hands-on care. It provides this critical need for multiple species in multiple recovery efforts across the country. Wildlife Preservation Canada utilizes science-based techniques such as conservation breeding and release, reintroduction and translocation. Its action plan is based on the urgency of the need and is updated annually. It was founded in 1985 by Gerald Durrell.

At the same time, Canada's conservation capacity is increased by providing young scientists the opportunity to gain hands-on experience in working with species at risk. Canada's New Noah scholarship program is designed to develop future conservation leaders with specialized expertise in recovery techniques for species on the brink of extinction.

== Research ==
All of the work yields measurable results. Scientists collect high-quality field data so the impact of their efforts may be quantified and effective recovery strategies planned. Tools and techniques are continually refined and improved and the results are published so that this new knowledge is shared and can be used elsewhere. When the data shows that hands-on intervention is no longer necessary—as in the case of the swift fox—the resources are deployed to help other species in greater need.
