= Spencer Beebe =

American conservationist and social entrepreneur

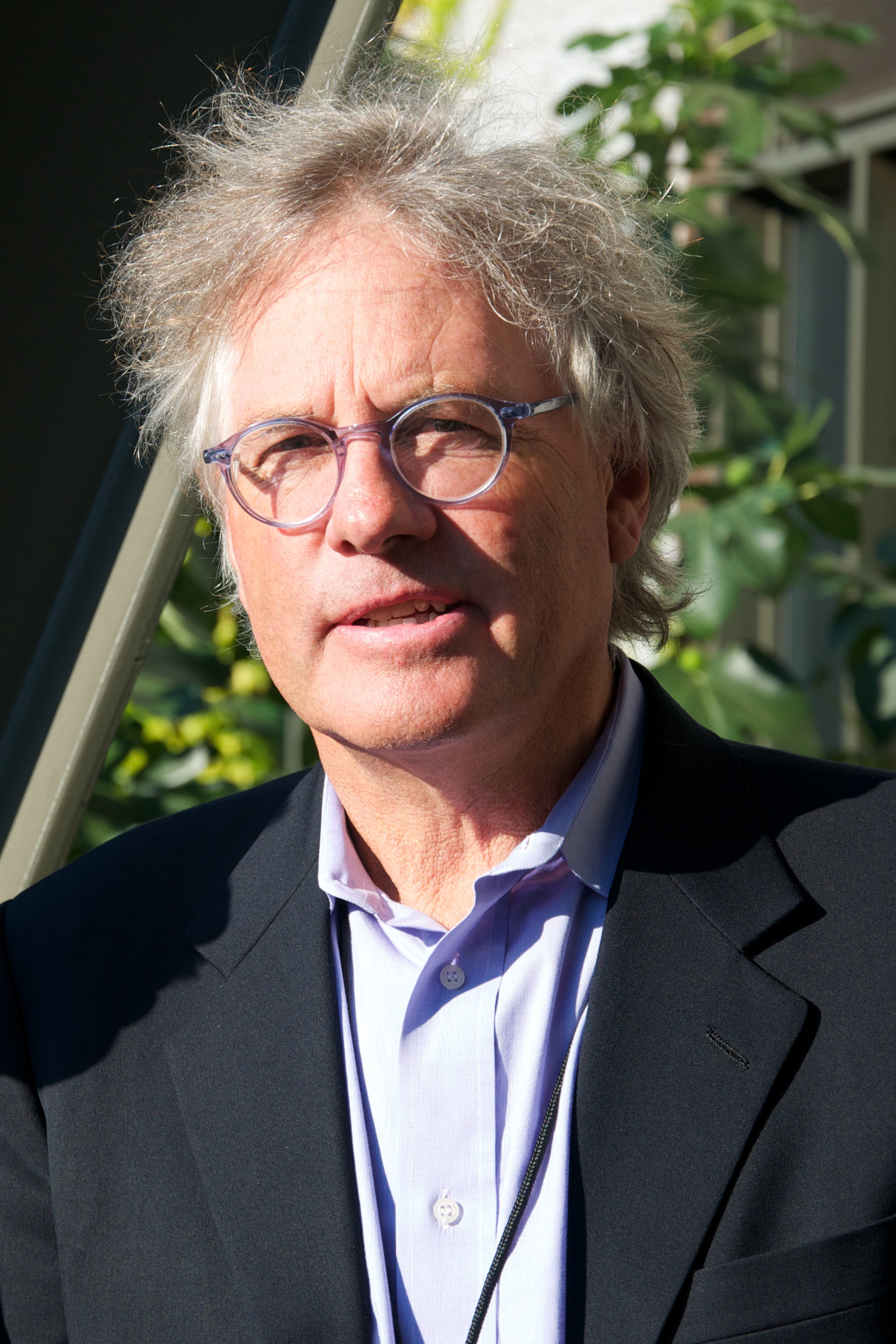
- Beebe
- Education: Yale School of the Environment
- Occupations: Conservationist, social entrepreneur, author
- Known for: Co-founding Conservation International; founding Ecotrust

Spencer Beebe is an American conservationist, social entrepreneur, and author. He worked for The Nature Conservancy before co-founding Conservation International in 1987, and founded Ecotrust in 1991. He wrote Cache: Creating Natural Economies (2010).

== Education and early career ==
Beebe is a fourth-generation Oregonian and earned a Master of Forest Science degree from Yale's School of Forestry & Environmental Studies (now the Yale School of the Environment). In the early 1980s he helped develop The Nature Conservancy's international program.

== Conservation International ==
Beebe co-founded Conservation International with Peter Seligmann in 1987 to pursue global biodiversity conservation through what the founders described as more innovative approaches. One of the organization's first actions was the 1987 Bolivia debt-for-nature swap, which involved purchasing foreign debt from Bolivia in exchange for the creation of a multi-million-acre nature reserve.

== Ecotrust ==
Beebe founded Ecotrust in 1991 and served as its founding chairman and president. The nonprofit is based in Portland, Oregon and works in the U.S. Pacific Northwest on projects linking conservation goals with local and regional economic development, including partnerships with Indigenous communities. Ecotrust's work has included initiatives such as a regional "Salmon Nation" and a "conservation economy".

== Approach and writing ==
In a 1997 profile, Beebe emphasized resilience and conservation approaches that work with natural processes. His book Cache: Creating Natural Economies draws on his career in conservation and development.

== Recognition ==
In 2014, he was selected to receive the Yale School of Forestry & Environmental Studies Distinguished Alumni Award. In 2015, he received the National Audubon Society's Dan W. Lufkin Prize for Environmental Leadership.

== Selected works ==
- Cache: Creating Natural Economies (2010)
