= Luzhi (disambiguation) =

Luzhi is a town in Jiangsu, China. It may also refer to:

- Luzhi, Vladimir Oblast, a village in Russia
- Huang Tingjian, Song dynasty calligrapher, courtesy name Luzhi (魯直)
- Baoding, a city in Hebei, China, known briefly during the Yuan dynasty as Luzhi (路治)
- Luzhi Township (芦芝乡), a village in Zhangping, Fujian
- Lüzhi Town (绿汁镇), a town in Yimen County, Yunnan

== See also ==
- Lu Zhi
