= Conservation finance =

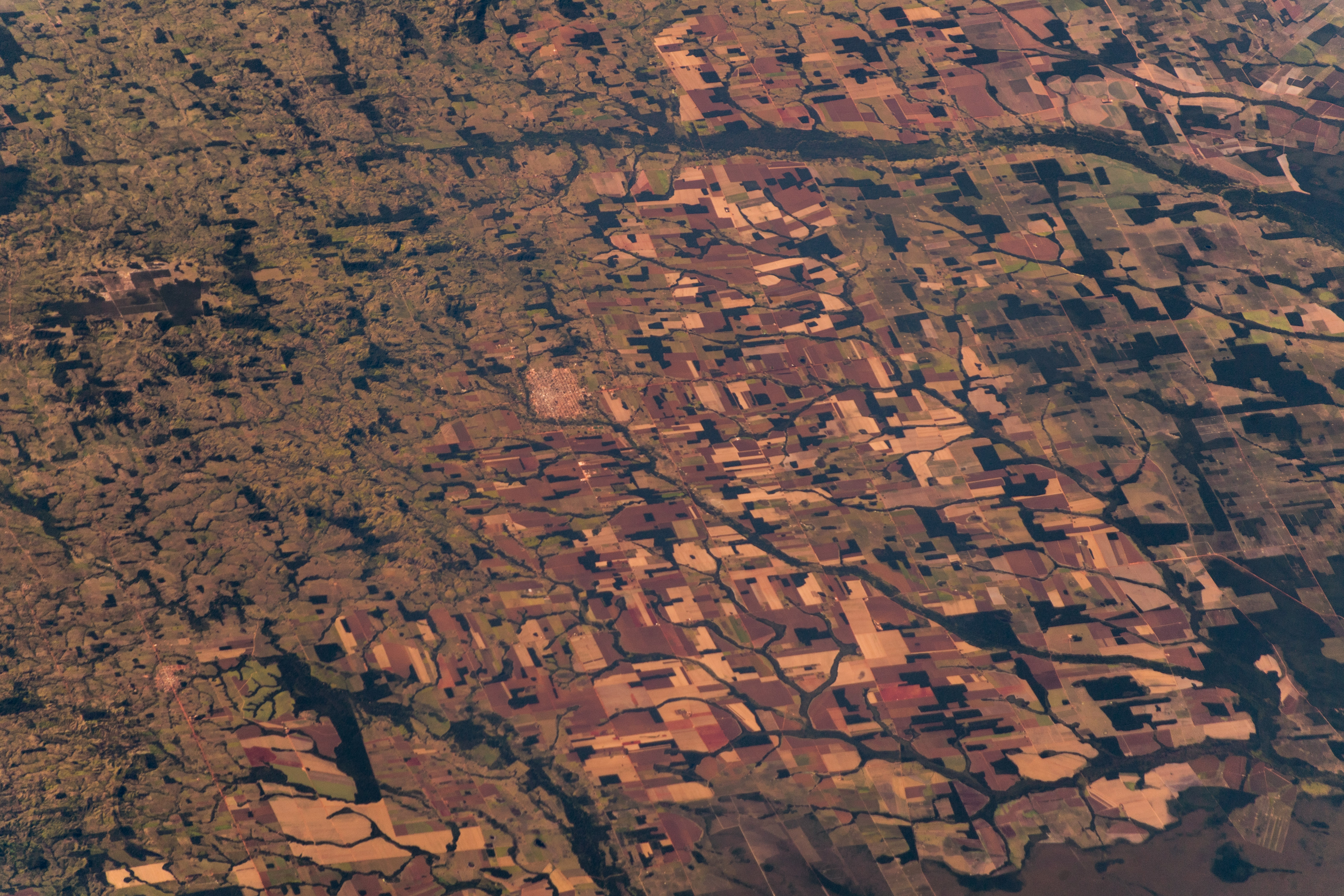
Space-based photograph of the Amazon rainforest (2018).

Conservation finance is the practice of raising and managing capital to support land, water, and resource conservation. It draws on public, private, and nonprofit funding sources, and can use instruments ranging from loans and grants to tax incentives and market-based mechanisms, at scales from local to national.

Conservation projects have traditionally relied on philanthropic donations and foundation grants, alongside government funding such as tax incentives, ballot measures, bonds, and agency appropriations. Some practitioners argue that these sources do not meet estimated global conservation needs; one widely cited estimate compared annual needs of hundreds of billions of dollars with much lower annual flows directed to conservation finance.

In response, conservation finance is sometimes framed as expanding the set of tools and capital sources used for conservation, including approaches that seek to leverage philanthropic and government resources with capital from financial markets, such as debt financing, tax benefits, private equity, and project finance. Examples discussed in the literature and policy documents include debt-for-nature swaps, payments for ecosystem services, and green bonds, as well as conservation-related funding delivered through foreign aid programmes.

== Overview ==
Conservation finance is sometimes distinguished from traditional conservation fundraising and funding. In this usage, fundraising and funding refer to raising and distributing non-repayable support, such as donations, foundation grants, and government appropriations, to pay for conservation work, while conservation finance refers to using a broader set of financial tools and capital sources to mobilise and manage capital for conservation outcomes.

Proponents of conservation finance often argue that existing public and philanthropic funding flows are far below estimated global conservation needs; one widely cited estimate compared annual needs of hundreds of billions of dollars with much lower annual flows directed to conservation finance. In response, conservation finance has been described as leveraging philanthropic and government resources with other sources of capital, including capital markets, through tools such as debt financing, tax benefits, private equity investments, and project finance.

Many conservation projects were historically financed through government appropriations and philanthropic grants, but the set of tools expanded over time to include mechanisms that link funding to specific conservation actions or outcomes and that seek additional sources of capital. Early examples include debt-for-nature swaps (developed in the 1980s) and the later growth of incentive-based approaches such as payments for ecosystem services. By the mid-2000s, conservation finance was increasingly described as a distinct field, with reference works cataloguing instruments ranging from land-protection tools and dedicated funds to market-based mechanisms and investment structures. More recent policy and market analyses emphasise mobilising larger volumes of private capital for nature-related outcomes, including through labelled bond markets and blended finance structures that combine public or philanthropic capital with private investment to improve project risk–return characteristics.

== Sources of capital and actors ==
Conservationists have traditionally relied upon private, philanthropic capital in the form of solicited donations and foundation grants, and public, governmental funds in the form of tax incentives, ballot measures, bonds, and agency appropriations, to fund conservation projects and initiatives.

Conservation finance can involve multiple categories of actors that provide capital, structure transactions, and implement projects. The mix of sources that can contribute to nature-related outcomes includes domestic public expenditures, international public finance (including official development assistance), and private expenditures and investments. Market-rate capital can come from private investors as well as from public and philanthropic investors operating through development finance institutions and multilateral development banks.

Intermediary and implementing organisations can include conservation non-governmental organisations (NGOs) and foundations. Large conservation NGOs can have significant expenditures, and NGOs may receive substantial revenue from governments and philanthropic foundations, which can complicate accounting for flows and risks double counting when estimating total finance. At the project level, some mechanisms direct funding to landholders or resource managers. For example, payment for ecosystem services (PES) can involve payments to service providers in exchange for maintaining ecosystem functions.

=== International public and multilateral finance ===
International public finance for conservation is commonly provided through Official development assistance (ODA) and related official flows, including grants and concessional lending as well as technical assistance and other support intended to promote development and welfare objectives in recipient countries. Delivery channels can include bilateral aid agencies, multilateral organisations, and public finance institutions, with funds flowing to governments, NGOs, and other implementing partners through projects, programmes, or dedicated funds.

Some analyses describe public and philanthropic capital as playing a catalytic role in conservation finance, for example by covering early-stage costs or sharing risk in ways intended to help mobilise private investment alongside public funding.

== Instruments and mechanisms ==
=== Carbon offsets and climate mechanisms ===
Carbon credits (often referred to as carbon offsets) are tradable units intended to represent a quantified greenhouse gas emission reduction or removal, and are used in both compliance and voluntary carbon markets. Because land-use and forest-related interventions can produce emissions reductions or removals (see Deforestation and climate change), forest-carbon crediting and results-based climate finance are sometimes discussed alongside other conservation finance tools as potential revenue streams linked to conservation and restoration activities.

REDD+ is a voluntary framework developed under the United Nations Framework Convention on Climate Change (UNFCCC) to encourage developing countries to reduce emissions from deforestation and forest degradation, and to promote conservation, sustainable forest management and enhancement of forest carbon stocks through financial incentives and policy support. UNFCCC decisions describe REDD+ as a phased approach, moving from readiness activities toward implementation and then results-based actions that are measured, reported and verified, and they include requirements related to safeguards and reporting on how safeguards are addressed and respected. The UNFCCC's Warsaw Framework for REDD+ (adopted at COP19 in 2013) set out further guidance on REDD+ implementation, including elements related to results-based finance, monitoring systems, reference levels, safeguards information, and technical analysis of reported results.

Under the Paris Agreement, Article 6 sets out pathways for voluntary cooperation between countries, including "cooperative approaches" that transfer internationally transferred mitigation outcomes (ITMOs) under Article 6.2 and a UNFCCC-supervised crediting mechanism under Article 6.4 (the Paris Agreement Crediting Mechanism). Article 6 cooperation is conditioned on environmental integrity, transparency and accounting intended to avoid double counting, and UNFCCC materials describe Article 6.4 as a centralized mechanism that issues credits and includes provisions such as a share of proceeds for the Adaptation Fund.

=== Debt-for-nature swaps ===
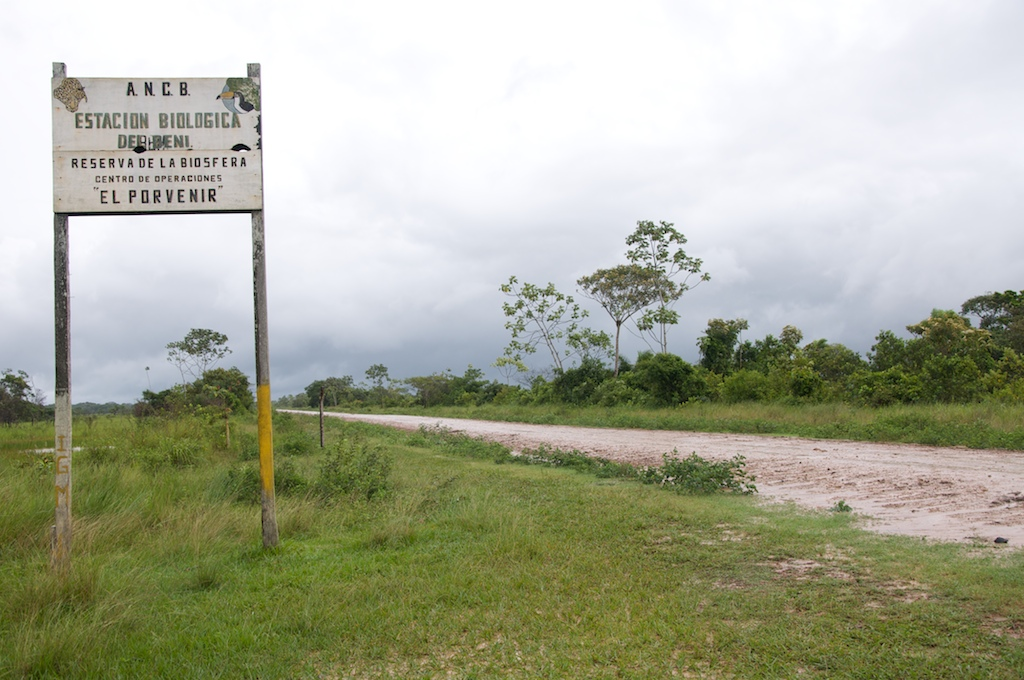
Estación Biológica del Beni (Beni Department, Bolivia).

A debt-for-nature swap is a transaction in which a portion of a country's external debt is purchased or forgiven--often at a discount--and the debtor government commits local-currency funding and/or policy measures for conservation. In common structures, an intermediary (such as an international conservation NGO) acquires debt on secondary markets or through creditor negotiations, and the debtor country's authorities (often the central bank and finance ministry) agree to redeem the debt in local currency for an agreed conservation programme implemented by designated domestic institutions.

A widely cited early swap was agreed in 1987 between the Government of Bolivia and Conservation International (CI), under which CI acquired US$650,000 of Bolivian external debt for US$100,000. Bolivia undertook conservation policy actions and committed local-currency funding for management activities in the Beni Biosphere Reserve and adjacent protected areas. In the Philippines, WWF purchased US$390,000 of Philippine debt in 1988 at a discounted cost of US$200,000; the Central Bank redeemed the face value in Philippine pesos over a two-year period, and the Haribon Foundation used the proceeds for conservation activities including support for protected areas and training programmes.

Because swaps convert external debt obligations into domestically managed conservation spending commitments, analyses describe governance and implementation capacity as important for effectiveness, and note that swap experience has informed later conservation financing approaches such as conservation trust funds.

=== Payments for ecosystem services ===
A payment for ecosystem services (PES) is an incentive mechanism in which payments are made to landholders or resource managers (service providers) conditional on maintaining, restoring, or enhancing a defined ecosystem service (or land-use practices intended to secure that service). PES is one approach to align financial incentives with conservation outcomes by linking funding to specified environmental performance.

PES programmes vary in how they are funded and governed. Schemes can be publicly financed (for example, government programmes that compensate landholders for conservation practices), privately financed or user-financed (for example, where downstream water users or companies pay upstream land managers), or organised through hybrid arrangements that involve multiple funders and intermediaries. Some PES arrangements operate through voluntary contracts, while others are embedded in regulatory frameworks; programmes may pay for specified actions or management practices, or (less commonly) for measured outcomes tied to ecosystem service delivery. Costa Rica is frequently cited as an example of a national PES-style programme in which the government pays service providers directly.

Design and implementation discussions often focus on governance issues such as how eligibility is defined, how payments are targeted, and how conditionality is established and enforced through monitoring and verification. Analyses also highlight challenges including establishing baselines and counterfactuals for effectiveness claims, addressing land tenure and equity concerns, and managing transaction costs that can be high for small or heterogeneous projects.

=== Bonds ===
Bonds are debt securities used to raise capital that is repaid over time. In conservation finance they can fund nature- and environment-related investments where a reliable repayment source (for example, public revenues or project revenues) is available.

Labelled bonds, such as green bonds (and related labels such as blue bonds), earmark proceeds for eligible environmental projects and typically follow voluntary market guidance on use of proceeds, project evaluation and selection, management of proceeds, and reporting (sometimes supported by external review). Some analyses discuss labelled bonds as one channel for mobilising private capital for nature-related objectives, including bond structures linked to sustainable forestry and fisheries and examples such as the Seychelles sovereign blue bond.

=== Conservation easements ===
Conservation easements are voluntary legal agreements that restrict certain uses of land in order to protect conservation values while typically keeping the land in private ownership. They are used by governments and land trusts to secure long-term conservation outcomes without necessarily purchasing the full property interest, and can be used to protect agricultural land, wetlands, habitat, or other conservation priorities.

=== Conservation trust funds ===
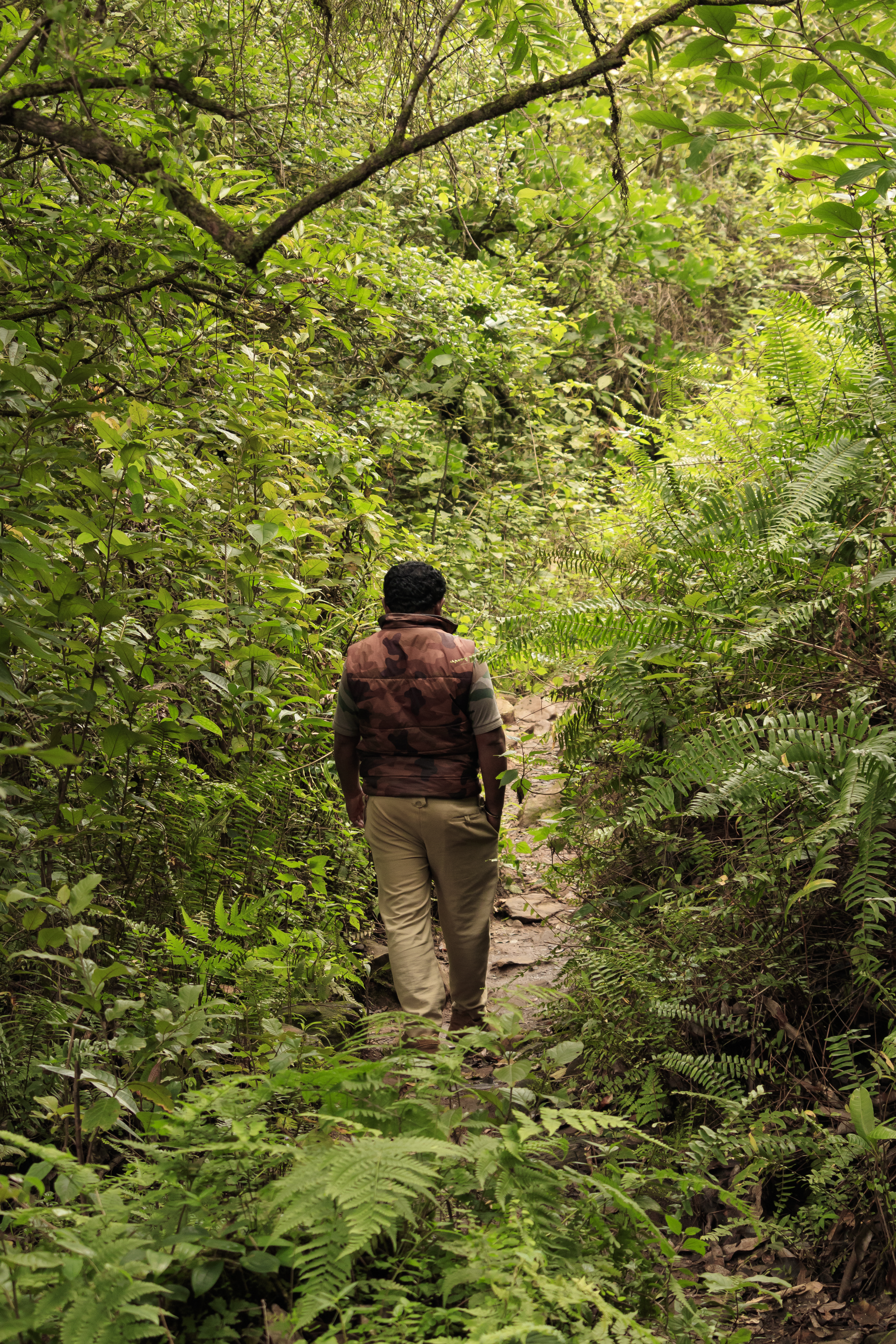
A forest ranger on the trail to Netravati Peak in the Kudremukh range (Karnataka, India).

Conservation trust funds (CTFs) are long-term financing mechanisms that provide grants to conservation projects and programmes, and are often structured as sinking funds or endowments intended to support conservation over extended time horizons. CTFs have been used to help fund protected area management and other conservation interventions, including by covering recurrent costs that can be difficult to sustain through short-term grants alone.

=== Biodiversity offsets and mitigation banking ===
Biodiversity offsets are conservation actions intended to compensate for residual adverse impacts on biodiversity after steps in the mitigation hierarchy (avoidance, minimisation, and on-site restoration) have been applied, often framed around goals such as "no net loss" or "net gain". In some jurisdictions, offsets are implemented through crediting approaches such as mitigation banking, in which accredited sites generate tradable credits that can be purchased to meet compensation obligations under regulatory programmes. Reviews of offset implementation under no net loss policies have described substantial variation across jurisdictions and highlighted data limitations for tracking outcomes and effectiveness at scale.

=== Blended finance ===
Blended finance refers to the strategic use of development or public finance to mobilise additional private finance towards sustainable development objectives, including by improving project risk-return characteristics (for example, through concessional capital, guarantees, or other structuring mechanisms). Nature-related blended finance structures are discussed as one way to address barriers to private investment, such as risk, small deal sizes, and transaction costs, by combining private capital with public or philanthropic capital in a single structure.

== Implementation and deal structure ==
Conservation finance transactions are typically structured around an identifiable source of cash flow or budget authority that can support conservation activities over time. Approaches include revenues linked to ecosystem services, contractual payments conditioned on conservation outcomes, and mechanisms intended to monetise economic benefits associated with nature in order to attract investment capital.

Projects may rely on intermediaries—such as conservation NGOs, specialised funds, or public finance institutions—to aggregate projects, conduct due diligence, and manage contracts and disbursements. At the programme level, contracts can be central to implementation. For example, PES schemes are agreements in which payments are made to service providers for maintaining ecosystem services, with payments typically conditioned on defined performance and monitoring. Debt-for-nature swaps also involve multiple parties and governance arrangements to convert external debt obligations into domestic conservation spending.

Risk allocation and transaction costs are frequently cited as barriers to scaling private investment for nature-related outcomes, and some analyses describe the use of blended finance structures that combine private capital with public or philanthropic capital to improve the risk-return profile of projects (for example through concessional terms or other risk-sharing arrangements).

Duration and enforcement can depend on the mechanism and legal context, but often rely on reporting and monitoring to demonstrate that proceeds or payments are used for eligible activities and to support accountability to funders and investors. Market guidance for labelled bonds, such as the Green Bond Principles, recommends practices including defined use-of-proceeds, processes for project evaluation and selection, management of proceeds, and periodic reporting, sometimes supplemented by external review. Monitoring and verification can also be part of programme design for performance-based mechanisms such as PES, and can affect transaction costs and feasibility.

== Measurement and accountability ==
Conservation finance arrangements often include requirements to monitor and report both the use of funds and the ecological results that financing is intended to support. Reporting may distinguish between outputs (such as funded activities or area under management) and outcomes (such as changes in ecological condition), but attribution can be difficult because conservation results may depend on baselines, counterfactuals, and long time horizons.

For labelled bonds, market guidance such as the Green Bond Principles recommends core practices including defined use-of-proceeds, processes for project evaluation and selection, management of proceeds, and periodic reporting, sometimes supplemented by external review, to support investor assurance that proceeds are allocated to eligible projects.

Several frameworks also aim to improve comparability of nature-related measurement and disclosures. The Task Force on Climate-related Financial Disclosures (TNFD) has published recommendations that include disclosure of nature-related dependencies and impacts, as well as suggested approaches to metrics and targets, while noting that data availability and methodological differences can limit consistency across organisations. Research on corporate biodiversity reporting has been found to develop largely in isolation from empirical work on agricultural biodiversity and community-based conservation.

At the system level, tracking biodiversity-related finance flows also involves methodological challenges, including classification of expenditures, coverage gaps, and risks of double counting when aggregating data across public, private, and nonprofit actors. Analyses of the conservation finance market have likewise identified measurement and reporting of conservation impacts as a practical barrier for scaling investment, particularly where monitoring and verification increase transaction costs.

== Challenges and criticism ==
Analyses of conservation finance commonly describe a gap between estimated conservation funding needs and the scale of finance that is mobilised and tracked for nature-related outcomes, alongside methodological challenges in classifying and aggregating biodiversity-related expenditures and investments.

=== Additionality, leakage and permanence ===
A recurring critique of performance-based and market-based conservation mechanisms is whether financed actions are additional--that is, whether they achieve conservation outcomes that would not have occurred in the absence of the payment or financing arrangement. Reviews of PES design and evidence have noted practical difficulties in establishing baselines and counterfactuals, which can affect claims about additionality and impact.

Related concerns include leakage (or spillovers), where conservation in one location may displace environmentally damaging activity to another area, reducing net benefits. Reviews of PES evidence have highlighted spillovers as an empirical and design issue, and have discussed how monitoring and programme rules can influence leakage risks.

Critics also raise permanence concerns, particularly where outcomes depend on continued compliance over long time horizons. Analyses of conservation incentive programmes note that durability of effects can depend on contract length, enforcement capacity, land-use pressures, and whether conservation behaviours persist after payments end.

=== Distributional equity and social concerns ===
Mechanisms used in conservation finance can raise distributional and participation questions, including who is eligible to receive payments or benefits, how programmes interact with land tenure and local livelihoods, and whether public funding disproportionately benefits wealthier landholders. Discussions of PES programmes have included debates about equity in access to compensation and the implications for poorer households and communities.

=== Governance, standards and greenwashing ===
Governance and credibility concerns also arise where conservation finance relies on labels, claims, and reporting rather than direct observation by funders or investors. Market guidance for labelled instruments, including the Green Bond Principles, recommends practices such as defined use-of-proceeds, processes for project selection, management of proceeds, and periodic reporting, sometimes supplemented by external review, as mechanisms intended to reduce information asymmetries and support accountability.

In biodiversity-focused finance, the International Finance Corporation has published guidance intended to clarify eligible activities and reporting practices for biodiversity finance and to align biodiversity finance frameworks with existing green bond and green loan market principles. More broadly, regulators have raised concerns about misleading sustainability-related claims in financial markets and have described ongoing efforts to address greenwashing risks through clearer standards and supervision.

=== Transaction costs and complexity ===
Transaction costs and deal complexity are frequently cited barriers to scaling conservation finance, especially where projects are small, heterogeneous, or require intensive monitoring and verification. Analyses of private finance for nature describe costs associated with project origination, aggregation, due diligence, contracting, and ongoing monitoring, which can limit investability and raise the cost of capital.

Some instruments can also involve multi-party governance arrangements and administrative complexity. Debt-for-nature swaps, for example, require coordination among debtor governments, creditors, and third-party organisations such as NGOs to convert external debt obligations into domestic conservation spending and management structures.

== See also ==
- Conservation movement

== Bibliography ==
- Clark, Story (2007). A Field Guide to Conservation Finance. Washington, DC: Island Press. ISBN 978-1-59726-758-8.
- Coady, Patrick (2005). "Conservation Finance Viewed as a System: Tackling the Financial Challenge". In James N. Levitt (ed.). From Walden to Wall Street: Frontiers of Conservation Finance. Washington, DC: Island Press. pp. 22–36. ISBN 978-1-59726-919-3.
- Davis, Adam (2005). "Mainstreaming Environmental Markets". In James N. Levitt (ed.). From Walden to Wall Street: Frontiers of Conservation Finance. Washington, DC: Island Press. pp. 155–171. ISBN 978-1-59726-919-3.
- Schuyler, Kevin W. (2005). "Expanding the Frontiers of Conservation Finance". In James N. Levitt (ed.). From Walden to Wall Street: Frontiers of Conservation Finance. Washington, DC: Island Press. pp. 109–123. ISBN 978-1-59726-919-3.
- Huwyler, Fabian; Kaeppeli, Juerg; Serafimova, Katharina; Swanson, Eric; Tobin, John. "Making Conservation Finance Investable". Stanford Social Innovation Review. Stanford University.
