= Critical Ecosystem Partnership Fund =

- Founded: 2000
- Location: Arlington, Virginia, US
- Executive Director: Olivier Langrand
- Website: www.cepf.net

Critical Ecosystem Partnership Fund (CEPF) is a joint biodiversity conservation initiative of l'Agence Française de Développement, Conservation International, European Union, Global Environment Facility, Government of Japan, and World Bank. CEPF also receives funding from several regional donors, including the MAVA Foundation, Margaret A. Cargill Philanthropies, and The Leona M. and Harry B. Helmsley Charitable Trust. The fund's headquarters are hosted at Conservation International in Arlington, Virginia, United States.

CEPF works to protect ecosystems and the species within them by awarding grants to local and international civil society organizations working in biodiversity hotspots around the world. Grant recipients include nonprofit organizations, indigenous peoples groups and small businesses, among others.

Since its inception, CEPF has funded conservation projects in 25 biodiversity hotspots across 105 countries and territories. The fund has committed a total of US$259 million to more than 2,500 civil society organizations.

== History ==
CEPF was developed by Conservation International's founding CEO Peter Seligmann and former president of the World Bank James Wolfensohn. The fund was founded in 2000 and began awarding grants in 2001.

In addition to Conservation International and the World Bank, the Global Environment Facility was a founding partner. Four additional donors later joined: L'Agence Française de Développement, the European Union, the Government of Japan and the MacArthur Foundation. The MacArthur Foundation ended its funding to CEPF in 2018.

== Approach to conservation ==
The CEPF Donor Council determines the biodiversity hotspots in which CEPF invests. Only hotspots that primarily include countries with developing or transitional economies are considered.

For each investment, CEPF prepares an extensive "ecosystem profile" to inform its conservation strategy in the respective hotspot. This document is developed in consultation with experts and local stakeholders and provides an overview of the political, socio-economic and environmental situation in the region. The ecosystem profile also identifies priority Key Biodiversity Areas (KBAs) and corridors, which become the specific places where CEPF awards grants.

CEPF awards two types of grants: small and large. The average size of small grants is about US$15,000. The average size of large grants is about US$150,000.

For each of its investments, CEPF establishes a regional implementation team located at an organization either within or close to the biodiversity hotspot. The regional implementation team is chosen through a competitive grant process and assists with awarding CEPF grants within the hotspot and developing the capacity of local organizations.

== Funding sites ==
Below are the biodiversity hotspots in which CEPF has made an investment:

2001 – 2006: Sundaland (USD 10 million)

2001 – 2011: Cape Floristic Region (USD 7.65 million)

2001 – 2012: Madagascar and the Indian Ocean Islands (USD 5.6 million)

2001 – 2013: Tropical Andes (USD 8.13 million)

2002 – 2007: Philippines (USD 7 million)

2002 – 2011: Atlantic Forest (USD 10.4 million)

2002 – 2011: Mesoamerica (USD 14.5 million)

2002 – 2013: Mountains of Southwest China (USD 7.9 million)

2002 – 2013: Tumbes-Chocó-Magdalena (USD 6.95 million)

2003 – 2012: Succulent Karoo (USD 9.3 million)

2003 – 2013: Caucasus (USD 9.5 million)

2004 – 2014: Coastal Forests of Eastern Africa (USD 8.75 million)

2005 – 2010: Himalaya (USD 5 million)

2008 – 2013: Indo-Burma (USD 9.7 million)

2008 – 2013: Polynesia–Micronesia (USD 7 million)

2008 – 2015: Western Ghats and Sri Lanka (USD 6 million)

2010 – 2015: Caribbean Islands (USD 6.9 million)

2010 – 2015: Maputaland-Pondoland-Albany (USD 6.65 million)

2012 – 2019: Eastern Afromontane (USD 12 million)

2013 – 2020: Indo-Burma (USD 15.8 million)

2013 – 2021: East Melanesian Islands (USD 9 million)

2014 – 2019: Wallacea (USD 6.85 million)

2015 – 2020: Madagascar and the Indian Ocean Islands (USD 9.54 million)

2015 – 2020: Tropical Andes (USD 10 million)

2016 – 2021: Cerrado (USD 8 million)

2016 – 2021: Guinean Forests of West Africa (USD 9 million)

2019 – 2024: Mountains of Central Asia (USD 8 million)

2020 – 2025: Indo-Burma (USD 10 million)

2021 – 2026: Caribbean Islands (USD 11.8 million)
