= Lu Zhi =

Lu Zhi, Lü Zhi, or Lu Chih may refer to:

- Empress Lü (呂雉), first empress of the Han dynasty
- Lu Zhi (Han dynasty) (盧植), courtesy name Zigan, minister of the Eastern Han dynasty
  - Lu Zhi (Jin dynasty) (盧志), courtesy name Zidao, great-grandson of the Eastern Han minister and confidant/strategist of Sima Ying
- Lu Zhi (Tang dynasty) (陸贄), chancellor of the Tang dynasty
- Lu Zhi (poet) (盧摯), poet of the Yuan dynasty
- Lu Zhi (painter) (陸治), painter of the Ming dynasty
- Lü Zhi (conservationist), Chinese panda expert
