= Conservation International =

Nonprofit environmental organization

- Abbreviation: CI
- Formation: 1987
- Founder: Spencer Beebe; Peter Seligmann
- Type: International NGO
- Tax ID no.: 52-1497470
- Legal status: 501(c)(3) nonprofit (United States)
- Purpose: Biodiversity conservation and human well-being
- Headquarters: Crystal City, Arlington County, Virginia, U.S.
- Region served: Worldwide
- Fields: Climate change, marine conservation, sustainable development, conservation science, conservation finance
- Chief executive officer: Sebastian Troëng
- Interim chair of the board: Lisa P. Jackson
- Key people: Harrison Ford (board member)
- Revenue: US$271 million (2024)
- Expenses: US$298 million (2024)
- Employees: 1,600+ (2025)
- Website: www.conservation.org

Conservation International (CI) is an American nonprofit environmental organization headquartered in Crystal City, Virginia. Founded in 1987 by Spencer Beebe and Peter Seligmann, it works internationally on biodiversity conservation and the links between ecosystems and human well-being, with programs that include climate and marine initiatives and work with governments, communities and other partners.

In 1987, CI helped negotiate a debt-for-nature swap with Bolivia -- the first of its kind. It adopted biodiversity hotspots as a framework for setting conservation priorities in 1989, and created the Rapid Assessment Program in 1990 to carry out time-limited biodiversity surveys intended to inform conservation decisions. CI has also been involved in conservation finance and multilateral initiatives, including participation in the 2000 launch of the Critical Ecosystem Partnership Fund and the creation of the Global Conservation Fund. Its public communications have included the celebrity-narrated campaign Nature Is Speaking (2014).

Conservation International operates primarily through Conservation International Foundation, a U.S. 501(c)(3) nonprofit, and works through country programs and affiliated entities in multiple regions. In fiscal year 2024, the foundation reported US$271 million in revenue and US$298 million in expenses, and CI reported more than 1,600 employees in 2025. The organization has faced criticism over aspects of project implementation and its engagement with corporate partners.

== History ==
=== Founding and 1980s ===
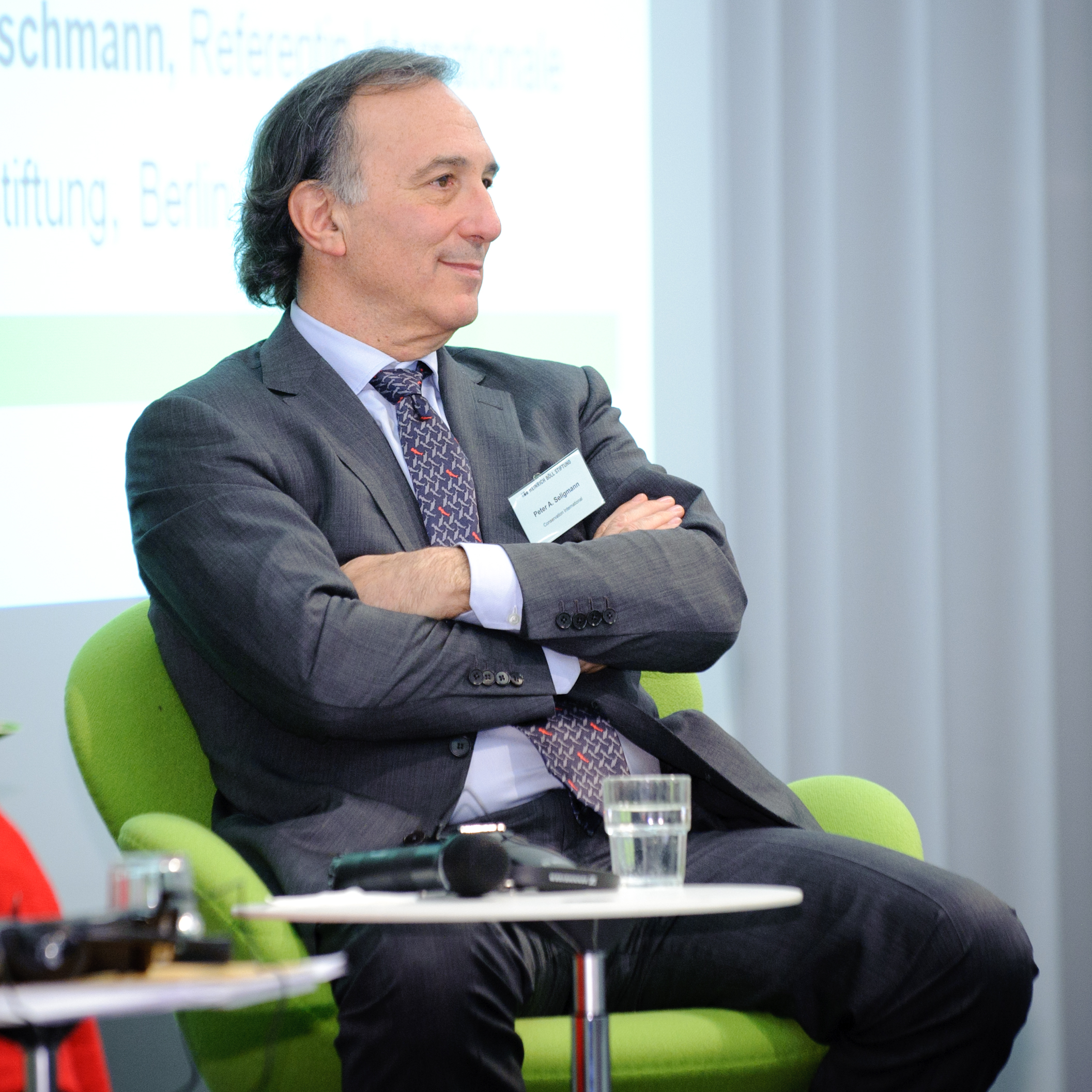
Peter Seligmann, co-founder of Conservation International, speaking at a 2010 conference in Berlin.

Conservation International was founded in 1987 by Peter Seligmann and Spencer Beebe. Seligmann had worked at The Nature Conservancy and left that organization with a small staff and three board members to co-found CI with Beebe. Although The Nature Conservancy had developed from a U.S. land trust model, CI's first major project was not a domestic land purchase but an international conservation-finance transaction linked to tropical protected areas. The organization's early niche combined international field projects, priority-setting for high-biodiversity regions, and financial mechanisms intended to direct conservation funding to tropical countries.

In July 1987, Conservation International and the Government of Bolivia signed a debt-for-nature swap agreement that has been described as the first of its kind. Conservation International acquired US$650,000 of Bolivian external debt for US$100,000. Bolivia provided the Beni Biological Station Biosphere Reserve with maximum legal protection, created three adjacent protected areas, and agreed to provide US$250,000 in local currency for management activities in the reserve. The transaction helped establish conservation finance as an important part of CI's institutional identity, linking biodiversity protection with financial tools, government commitments, and local-currency funding for protected-area management.

In 1989, Conservation International adopted biodiversity hotspots as a framework for setting conservation priorities. The hotspot approach emphasized regions with high concentrations of endemic species and substantial habitat loss, providing a global screening tool for directing limited conservation resources. Together, the Bolivia debt swap and the adoption of hotspots reflected an early model built around international partnerships, biodiversity science, and finance rather than a single-country land-acquisition programme.

=== 1990s ===
In the early 1990s, Conservation International halted direct-mail fundraising and expanded its programs using support from board members and foundation grants, including from the MacArthur Foundation. In 1990, it entered its first corporate partnership, with McDonald's Corporation.

In 1990, Conservation International created the Rapid Assessment Program, a rapid biodiversity survey initiative intended to support conservation decision-making by generating biological information from field assessments. In the mid-1990s, the organization expanded its fundraising strategies, with increased emphasis on foundations and wealthy individual donors. In 1998, Conservation International scientists published an approach to setting conservation priorities that combined biodiversity hotspots and major tropical wilderness areas.

=== 2000s ===
In 2000, Conservation International participated in the launch of the Critical Ecosystem Partnership Fund (CEPF), a partnership between the World Bank, the Global Environment Facility, and Conservation International that supports civil society conservation work in biodiversity hotspots. The John D. and Catherine T. MacArthur Foundation joined CEPF as a partner in 2001, and the Government of Japan joined in 2002.

In 2001, Conservation International launched the Global Conservation Fund, which focuses on establishing the financial sustainability of specific protected areas. In 2004, Starbucks launched Coffee and Farmer Equity (C.A.F.E.) Practices, a verification program developed by Starbucks, Conservation International, and SCS Global Services.

In 2008, Conservation International updated its mission to focus on the connections between human well-being and natural ecosystems, and expanded its work with a stronger focus on marine conservation, scientific research, conservation finance, and partnerships with governments, corporations, and Indigenous and local communities.

=== 2010s ===
In 2014, Conservation International launched the public-awareness campaign Nature Is Speaking at SXSW Eco in Austin, Texas.

In 2017, M. Sanjayan was named chief executive officer, succeeding Peter Seligmann, who remained chair of the board.

=== 2020s ===
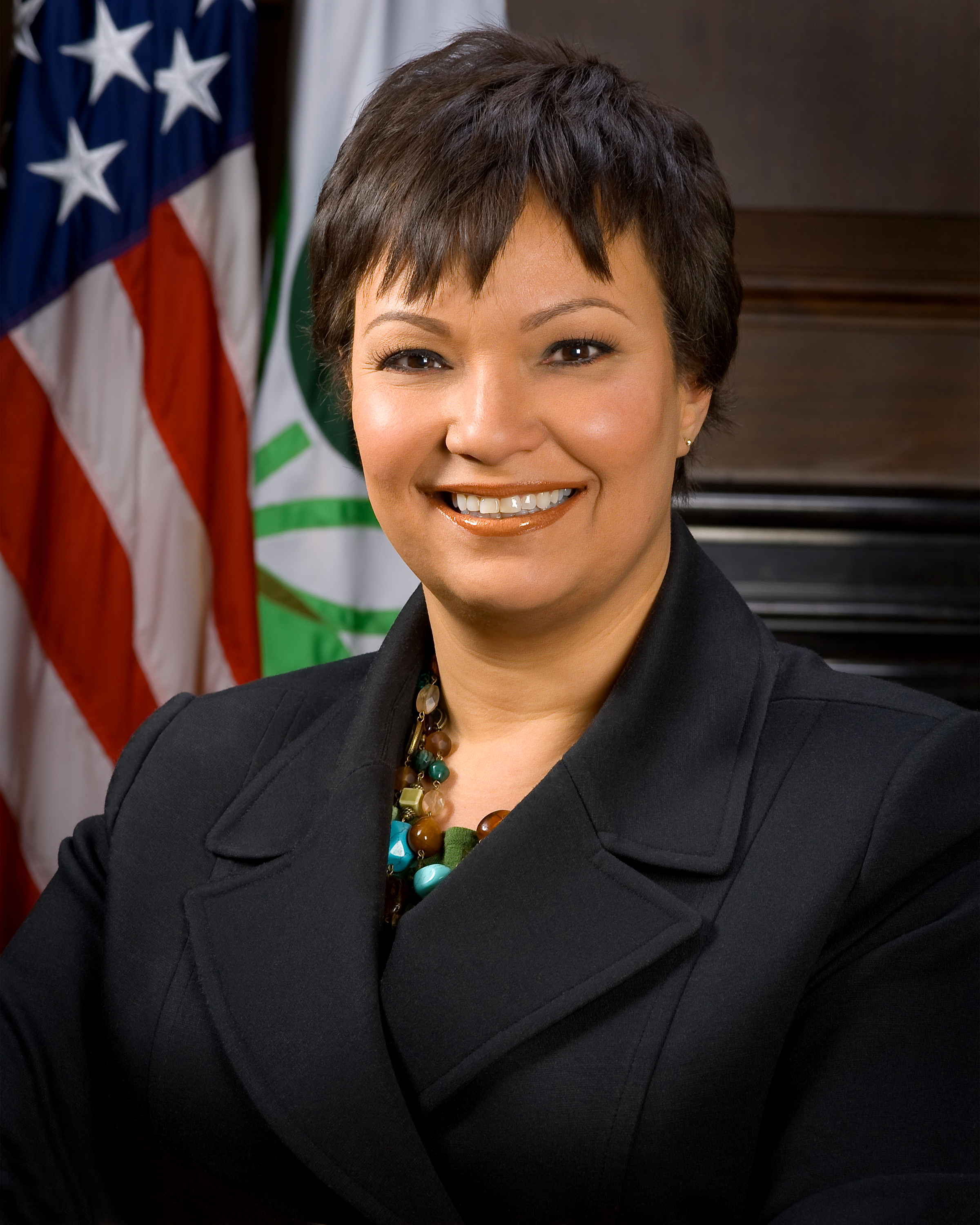
Lisa P. Jackson, named interim chair of Conservation International's board in 2026, in a 2009 official portrait.

In August 2025, Sanjayan stepped down as CEO, and Daniela Raik was appointed interim chief executive officer while the board conducted a search for a permanent CEO. In February 2026, Conservation International announced Sebastian Troëng as chief executive officer and named Lisa P. Jackson interim chair of the board, succeeding Robert J. Fisher. Conservation International epidemiologist Dr. Neil Vora was named to the 2025 Time 100 Next list. In fiscal year 2024, CI reported expenditures of more than US$297 million.

== Approach and priorities ==
Conservation International combines science-based priority setting with partnerships and financing mechanisms to support conservation at scale.

=== Conservation priority-setting ===
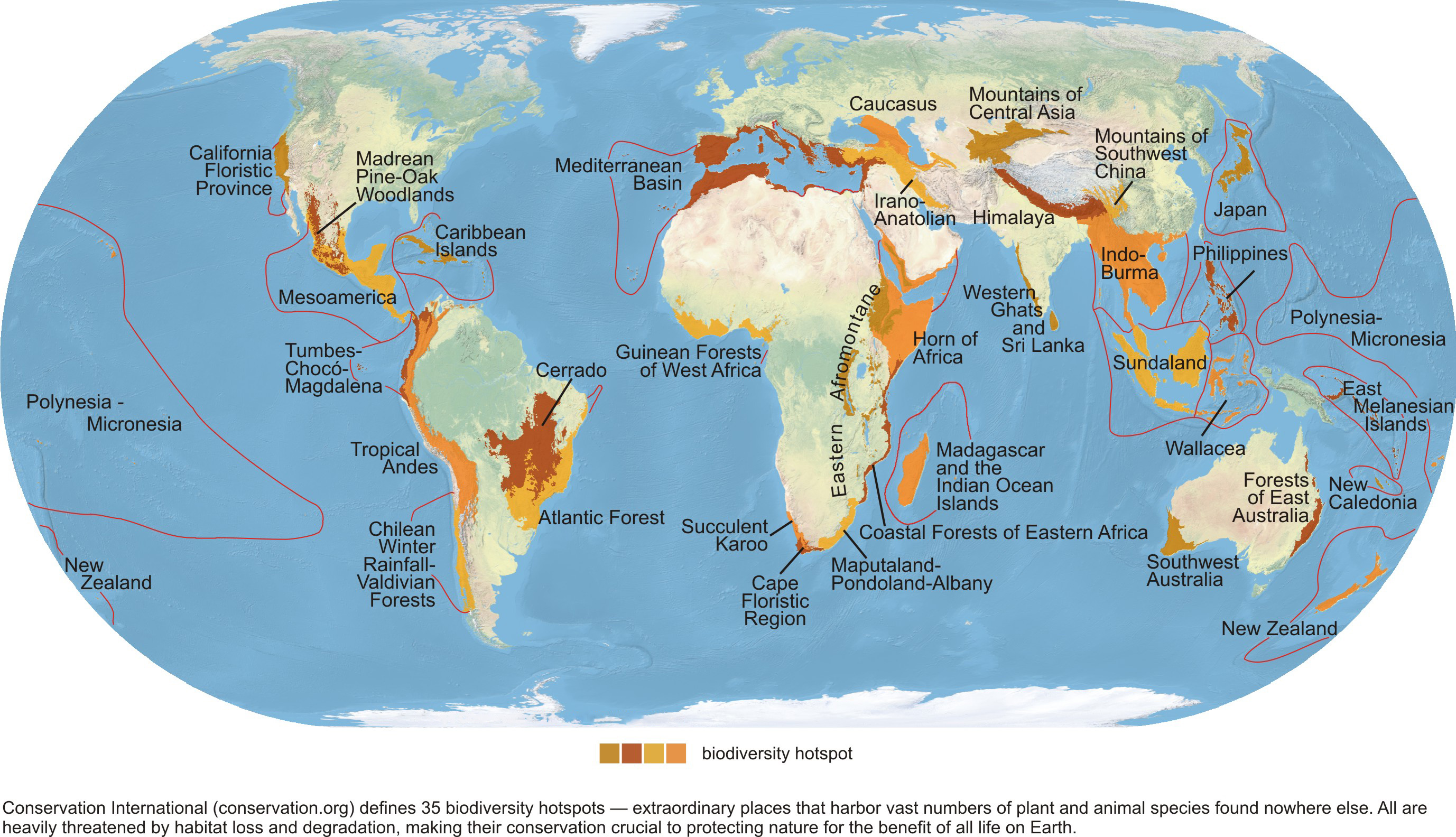
Biodiversity hotspots, a priority-setting framework adopted by Conservation International in 1989.

Conservationists use biodiversity hotspots as a screening tool for prioritizing conservation investment in regions that combine high concentrations of endemic species with extensive habitat loss. CI adopted the hotspots framework and has used it alongside other priority geographies such as major tropical wilderness areas and marine regions in its conservation work. Researchers have debated hotspot-based prioritization, with critiques that concentrating resources on hotspots can overlook areas outside hotspot boundaries that still have high conservation value.

=== Human well-being emphasis and communications ===
In 2008, Conservation International updated its mission and programme framing to emphasize the relationship between natural ecosystems and human well-being. The shift placed the organization within a broader movement in conservation science that treated biodiversity protection, ecosystem services, development, climate resilience and human livelihoods as linked objectives rather than separate policy areas. This approach was reflected in CI's growing emphasis on ecosystem services, nature-based solutions, conservation finance, climate adaptation, marine conservation and partnerships with governments, corporations, Indigenous peoples and local communities.

The public message most closely associated with this change was that "people need nature to thrive". In practice, this framing moved CI's public communications away from appeals based mainly on protecting nature for its own sake and toward arguments that functioning ecosystems support food, freshwater, climate stability, health, livelihoods and economic security. The shift also helped connect the organization's older biodiversity-priority-setting work to newer programme areas such as blue carbon, freshwater assessment, climate adaptation and sustainable production landscapes.

CI's best-known expression of this communications strategy was the 2014 campaign Nature Is Speaking, launched at SXSW Eco in Austin, Texas. The campaign used short films narrated by celebrity voices to personify elements of nature and to argue that nature would persist in some form, but that human societies depend on functioning natural systems. Academic analysis of the campaign described it as a form of celebrity-mediated environmental communication that constructed nature as a speaking subject and linked concern for nature to concern for human futures.

The people-centred framing also placed CI within debates over the so-called "new conservation" movement. Supporters of human-well-being approaches argued that conservation strategies needed to integrate biodiversity protection with poverty, development, corporate behaviour, ecosystem services and the realities of human-dominated landscapes. Critics argued that framing nature mainly through human benefits, economic value or corporate partnerships could weaken commitments to biodiversity protection and the intrinsic value of non-human life. In CI's case, these debates overlapped with criticism of its corporate partnerships and of carbon-credit projects, which are discussed in the article's reception and criticism section.

=== Indigenous peoples and local communities ===
Work with Indigenous peoples and local communities has been a recurring feature of Conservation International's programme model, especially where conservation depends on community governance, customary tenure, or long-term agreements over land and marine resources. Examples have included a proposed communal-reserve co-management model in the Peruvian Amazon, support for the Wai Wai-managed Kanashen Amerindian Protected Area in Guyana, the South Suriname Conservation Corridor advanced with Trio and Wayana communities, Māori-led ocean initiatives associated with Hinemoana Halo in Aotearoa New Zealand, conservation-lease arrangements with iTaukei landowners in Fiji's Sovi Basin, and ecological restoration work with Siona communities in Putumayo, Colombia.

Questions about community consent, land tenure and benefit-sharing in some CI-linked projects are discussed further in the article's reception and criticism section.

== Science and research ==
The Betty and Gordon Moore Center for Science and Solutions serves as Conservation International's research hub. Its work links scientific research with field programmes, decision-support tools, monitoring, and applied conservation planning. The center works with CI field staff, traditional knowledge holders, communities, governments and other partners, and its staff structure includes roles focused on biodiversity science, nature-based solutions, blue carbon and science-for-impact functions.

A long-running strand of CI's conservation science has been global priority-setting. Published work associated with CI scientists includes frameworks for identifying biodiversity hotspots and major tropical wilderness areas as priority geographies for conservation investment. These approaches were intended to help direct limited conservation resources toward regions with high biodiversity value, high endemism, habitat loss or large remaining intact tropical ecosystems.

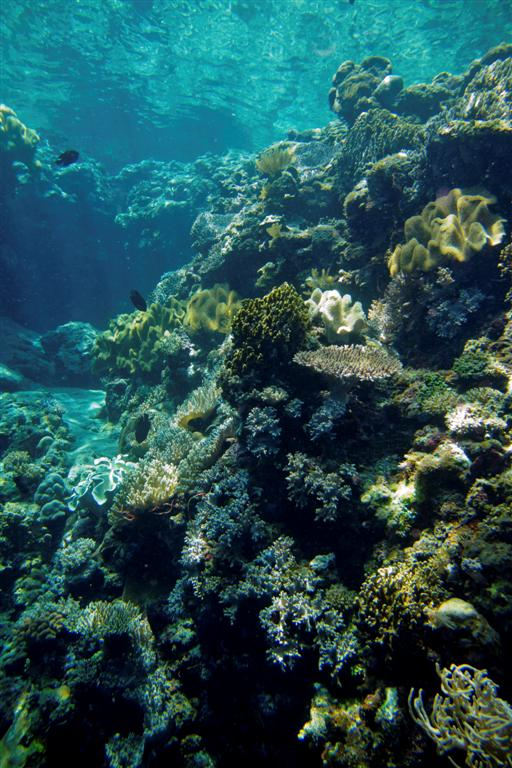
Shallow-water coral reef off Ataúro Island, Timor-Leste, representative of the marine environments documented in CI's rapid assessment work.

Field assessment has been another part of the organization's science programme. The Rapid Assessment Program, created in 1990, was designed to generate biological information from time-limited field assessments to support conservation decision-making. Rapid Assessment Program reports have been used in country and regional programmes as baseline surveys for protected-area planning, marine zoning and biodiversity documentation, including later country-level work in places such as Timor-Leste, New Caledonia and Liberia.

Research on ecosystem services, climate adaptation and nature-based solutions has connected the Moore Center's science work to CI's field programmes. Conservation scientists have contributed to research on ecosystem-based adaptation for smallholder farmers, including analysis of how agricultural practices can use biodiversity and ecosystem services to help farmers adapt to climate change. CI-affiliated scientists have also contributed to work quantifying the climate-mitigation potential of natural climate solutions, including conservation, restoration and improved land-management actions that increase carbon storage or avoid greenhouse-gas emissions.

Some research has been tied directly to monitoring and evaluation of field programmes. In Madagascar, for example, a peer-reviewed midterm impact evaluation of the Green Climate Fund-supported Sustainable Landscapes for Eastern Madagascar project examined a CI-associated programme designed to increase smallholder resilience and reduce emissions through climate-smart agriculture and sustainable forest management in the CAZ and COFAV landscapes. This type of work connects CI's science function to questions of programme design, impact measurement and accountability.

Decision-support tools associated with CI science include freshwater, ocean and ecosystem-service assessment frameworks. The Freshwater Health Index integrates social, hydrological and ecological dimensions of freshwater systems, combining indicators of ecosystem vitality, ecosystem services and governance to help water managers and stakeholders assess trade-offs in river basins. The Ocean Health Index, developed by an interdisciplinary research team that included Conservation International participation, assesses ocean health through ecological, social and economic benefits that oceans provide to people; it has been adapted in global and regional assessments.

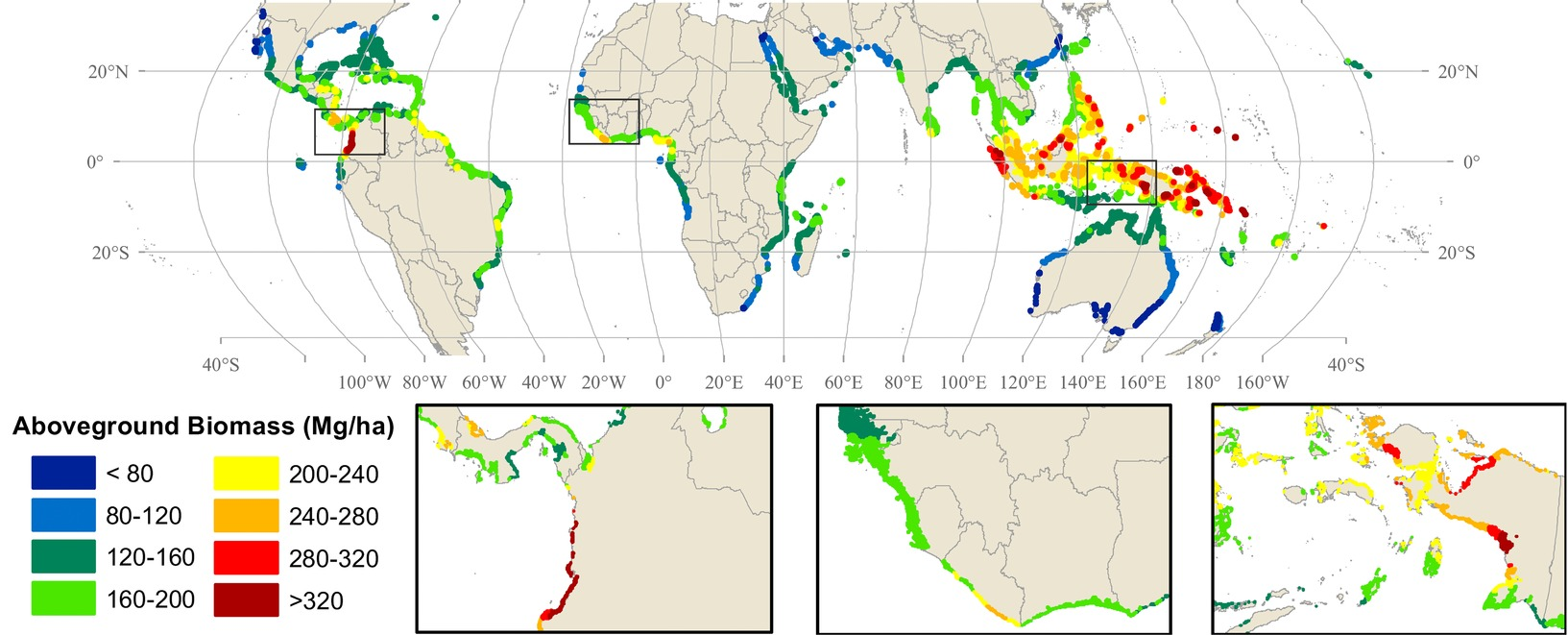
Estimated global distribution of above-ground carbon stored in mangroves, a core theme of blue-carbon assessment work.

Blue-carbon science forms another applied research area linked to the organization's climate and marine programmes. Conservation International, the Intergovernmental Oceanographic Commission of UNESCO and the International Union for Conservation of Nature published a methods manual for assessing carbon stocks and emission factors in mangroves, tidal salt marshes and seagrass meadows, three coastal ecosystems central to blue-carbon accounting. In the wider article, this research area connects to CI-linked blue-carbon and coastal-resilience work in countries such as Singapore, Costa Rica, Ecuador and Fiji.

== Global programs and initiatives ==
Conservation International has launched and supported a number of cross-border initiatives and campaigns that are managed centrally or implemented across multiple countries, alongside its country programs.

=== Conservation finance ===
Conservation International has been associated with the use of conservation finance--financial mechanisms intended to mobilize and direct capital toward conservation, often by pairing conservation outcomes with durable funding streams and, in some cases, financial returns.

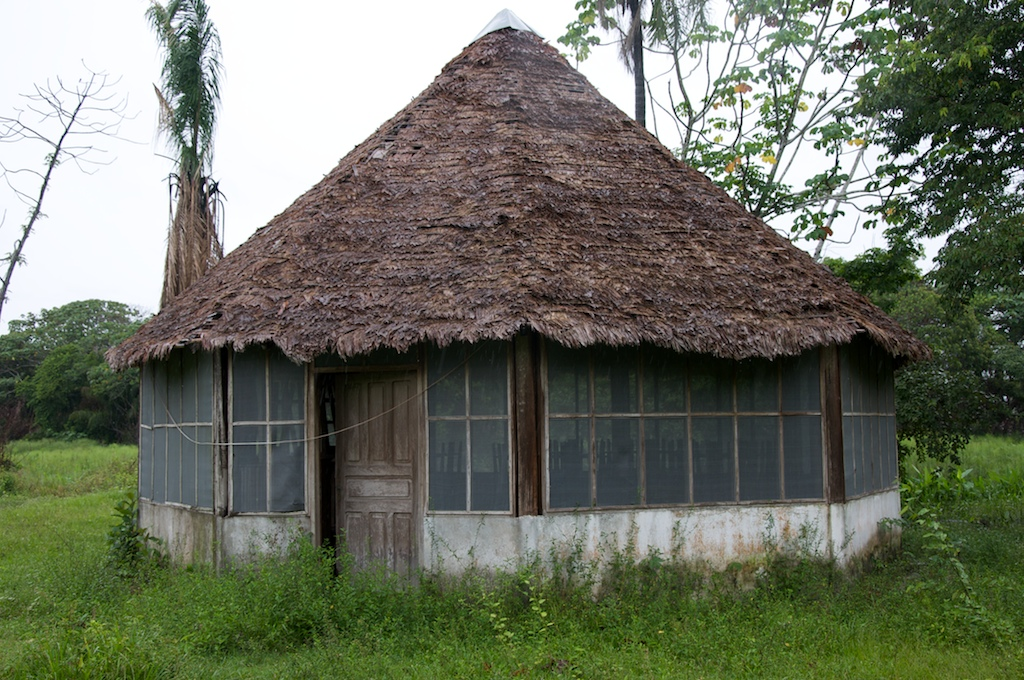
The Beni Biological Station in Bolivia, associated with CI's early debt-for-nature swap work.

CI's early history is linked to debt-for-nature swaps: in 1987 it helped negotiate a debt conversion with Bolivia that has been described as the first swap of its kind, directing local-currency resources toward protected-area creation and management funding.

In later decades, CI helped launch or participate in conservation-finance platforms designed to support biodiversity priorities at scale, including the Critical Ecosystem Partnership Fund and the Global Conservation Fund, which supports the long-term financial sustainability of specific protected areas. CI-linked programmes have also used performance-based approaches such as voluntary-market REDD+ finance linked to conservation agreements, and have participated in project-finance-for-permanence initiatives designed to secure long-term funding for protected-area systems.

=== Climate and carbon ===
Conservation International's climate-related work includes forest and rangeland carbon projects, coastal blue carbon initiatives, public climate-finance projects, and corporate climate-finance partnerships. Forest and rangeland projects have used mechanisms such as REDD+, restoration finance and carbon credits to support protected-area management, conservation agreements and landscape restoration. Examples include the Alto Mayo Protection Forest REDD+ project in Peru, the Chyulu Hills Carbon Project in Kenya, and a Prey Lang Wildlife Sanctuary REDD+ project in Cambodia under Japan's Joint Crediting Mechanism.

Blue-carbon work concerns carbon stored in coastal and marine ecosystems such as mangroves, seagrass meadows and salt marshes. Conservation International-linked blue-carbon activities have included research, policy support, restoration planning and project finance in coastal regions. The Singapore-based International Blue Carbon Institute functions as a hub for blue-carbon research, implementation and capacity-building, while country-level projects have included mangrove and coastal-wetland work in Costa Rica, Ecuador and Fiji.

Some climate-related work has been financed through public environmental and climate funds. Conservation International Foundation has served as an accredited entity for Green Climate Fund projects in Madagascar, Botswana and Ecuador, and has participated in Global Environment Facility projects with climate, land-use or deforestation components in countries including Brazil, Kenya and Liberia. Corporate climate finance has included carbon-credit purchases, restoration funds and blue-carbon research support, including Disney's retirement of credits from Alto Mayo, Apple's Restore Fund work with Conservation International, and Amazon's support for the International Blue Carbon Institute. Criticism of offset-linked projects is discussed in the article's reception and criticism section.

=== Multilateral project roles ===
Conservation International has acted as a project agency, accredited entity, implementing agency or executing partner in some projects financed by multilateral environmental funds. Conservation International Foundation has served as an accredited entity for Green Climate Fund projects in Madagascar, Botswana and Ecuador, including sustainable-landscape, rangeland and mangrove-climate initiatives. In Global Environment Facility programming, CI or its country programmes have also held project-agency, implementing or executing roles in projects in countries including Ecuador, Kenya, Liberia and Timor-Leste. These roles differ from CI's grantmaking and advocacy work because they involve formal responsibilities within public environmental-finance project structures.

=== Capacity building and training ===
Capacity building is a recurring part of Conservation International's work, alongside field conservation and finance. Programmes have included internships, scholarships, practitioner support, environmental education and community training. In Singapore, Conservation International's internship programme gives tertiary students experience in Asia-Pacific conservation work, and the MAC3 Conservation Scholarship supports postgraduate research on topics such as blue carbon and riparian ecosystems. At a broader institutional level, CI has also supported Indigenous leaders conservation fellowships and an Indigenous Peoples Negotiations Program intended to strengthen the ability of Indigenous peoples and local communities to participate in conservation and development negotiations.

Country and regional programmes have used capacity-building approaches in more localized forms. In Timor-Leste, participatory learning tools and community nurseries have been used to support reforestation and natural-resource management, while Samoa's Guardians programme used the traditional voyaging canoe Gaualofa as a platform for hands-on environmental education in coastal districts. In China, Freshwater Health Index work and wetland projects have combined assessment tools with stakeholder engagement, nature education and community engagement, while in New Caledonia, co-management around Mont Panié has involved the community-run Dayu Biik association and activities linked to conservation, environmental education and ecotourism.

=== Corporate partnerships ===
Corporate partnerships have been part of Conservation International's operating model since the organization's early years, including work on supply-chain standards, conservation finance, climate initiatives, marketing partnerships and corporate sustainability advice. In 1990, CI entered its first corporate partnership, with McDonald's, in work later described as focused on sustainable supply-chain issues and biodiversity conservation. In 2004, Starbucks launched Coffee and Farmer Equity (C.A.F.E.) Practices, a verification programme developed with Conservation International and SCS Global Services to assess coffee production against economic, social and environmental criteria. Conservation International Japan has also maintained corporate relationships with companies including Daikin and Mitsubishi Corporation, connected to corporate strategy, carbon and nature commitments, and cause-related communications.

In the 2020s, corporate and philanthropic partnerships have been linked to climate finance and marine-conservation initiatives. Apple and Conservation International have worked through the Restore Fund and related restoration efforts; Amazon and other funders have supported the Singapore-based International Blue Carbon Institute; Disney has retired carbon credits from the Alto Mayo project in Peru; and the Walmart Foundation has supported jurisdictional initiatives intended to improve environmental, social and economic performance in Pacific albacore tuna fisheries. Criticism of CI's corporate partnerships and offset-linked projects is discussed in the article's reception and criticism section.

=== Critical Ecosystem Partnership Fund ===
The Critical Ecosystem Partnership Fund (CEPF) is a multi-donor grantmaking initiative that supports civil-society conservation projects in biodiversity hotspots. Conservation International participated in CEPF’s launch in 2000 as a partnership with the World Bank and the Global Environment Facility. The John D. and Catherine T. MacArthur Foundation joined CEPF as a partner in 2001, and the Government of Japan joined in 2002.

=== Global Conservation Fund ===
In 2001, Conservation International launched the Global Conservation Fund, which focuses on establishing the financial sustainability of specific protected areas.

=== Rapid Assessment Program ===
In 1990, Conservation International created the Rapid Assessment Program, a rapid biodiversity survey initiative intended to support conservation decision-making by generating biological information from field assessments.

=== Marine conservation ===
Conservation International's marine work has generally combined support for marine protected areas and protected-area networks with marine spatial planning, fisheries initiatives, blue carbon projects and long-term conservation finance. Rather than focusing only on individual protected areas, several programmes have operated at seascape or national-waters scales, where conservation planning is linked to fisheries management, tourism, coastal livelihoods and durable funding. Examples include the Phoenix Islands Protected Area in Kiribati, the Raja Ampat marine protected-area network in Indonesia, the Verde Island Passage network in the Philippines, and Samoa's national marine spatial-planning framework.

In several cases, governments or local institutions have designated or managed protected waters while CI and other partners have provided scientific surveys, planning support, financing, monitoring, or capacity-building. In Raja Ampat, peer-reviewed research described Conservation International and other non-governmental organisations as bridging actors in the planning, adoption and management of the marine protected-area network, including support for a tourism entrance-fee system, patrol arrangements and the Blue Abadi Fund. Similar network-oriented approaches appear in the Verde Island Passage, where local-government alliances coordinated dozens of marine protected areas, and in Samoa, where the marine spatial plan incorporates new offshore protected areas and existing nearshore managed areas.

Fisheries and coastal-livelihood work forms another strand of CI's marine programme. In Hawaiʻi, its programme has worked with partners including NOAA Fisheries on sustainable seafood and the utilisation of invasive reef fish, while in Palau it has supported planning and capacity-building linked to the Palau National Marine Sanctuary and the country's domestic fishing zone. Coastal and blue-carbon initiatives link marine conservation to climate adaptation and mitigation by focusing on carbon-rich ecosystems such as mangroves and seagrass meadows. CI-linked projects have included mangrove and blue-carbon work in Costa Rica's Gulf of Nicoya and in Ecuador's coastal mangrove regions, as well as coastal-resilience work at Weg naar Zee in Suriname.

=== Pacific ocean initiatives ===
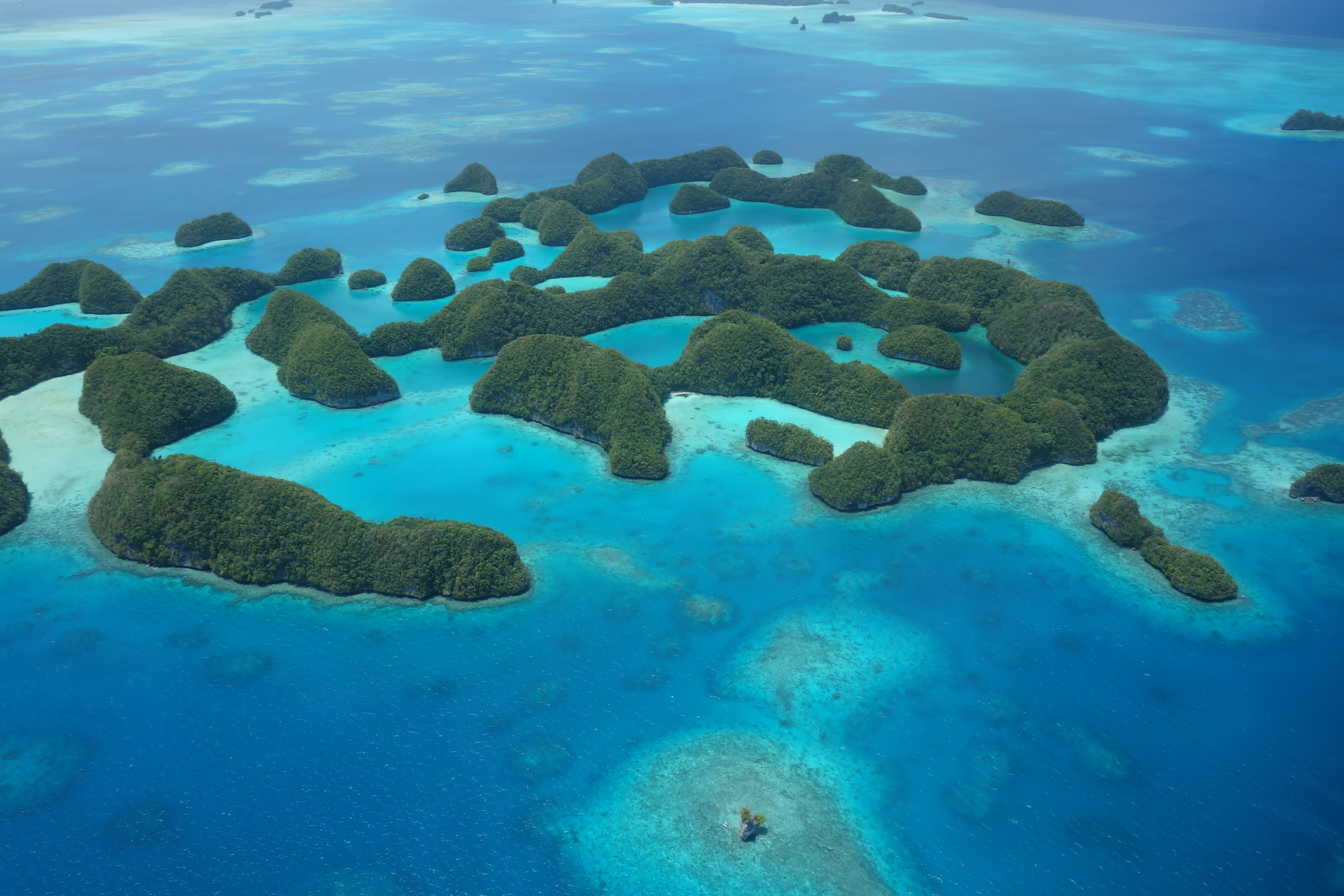
Ngerukewid Islands, Palau.

In Kiribati, the Phoenix Islands Protected Area was created in 2008 through a partnership between the Government of Kiribati, Conservation International and the New England Aquarium. In Hawaiʻi, Conservation International’s programme has worked with partners including NOAA Fisheries on sustainable seafood and fisheries initiatives, including efforts to increase utilisation of invasive reef fish such as ta‘ape (bluestripe snapper).

In Palau, Conservation International has worked with Palauan partners to support management and sustainability planning for the Palau National Marine Sanctuary and the country's domestic fishing zone, including marine-spatial-planning and fisheries-capacity initiatives aimed at developing a sustainable, Palauan-owned domestic fishery.

In Samoa, Conservation International's country programme has supported ocean governance and marine spatial planning through the Samoa Ocean Strategy and the Samoa Marine Spatial Plan. The Samoa Marine Spatial Plan 2025–2035 establishes an ocean-management system for Samoan waters, includes nine new fully protected marine protected areas, and incorporates existing nearshore managed areas.

=== Mountains to Mangroves ===
Mountains to Mangroves is a regional ecosystem protection and restoration initiative in the Eastern Himalayas (including Bhutan, Bangladesh, India, and Nepal) that is catalyzed by Conservation International and aims to support large-scale restoration and tree planting across the landscape. In Bhutan, the initiative has included a partnership intended to restore 50,000 hectares of degraded land over the next decade. In 2025, the United Kingdom partnered with Conservation International on the Mountains to Mangroves Atlas, a digital map intended to help guide nature-based solutions across the Eastern Himalayas.

== Governance and organizational structure ==
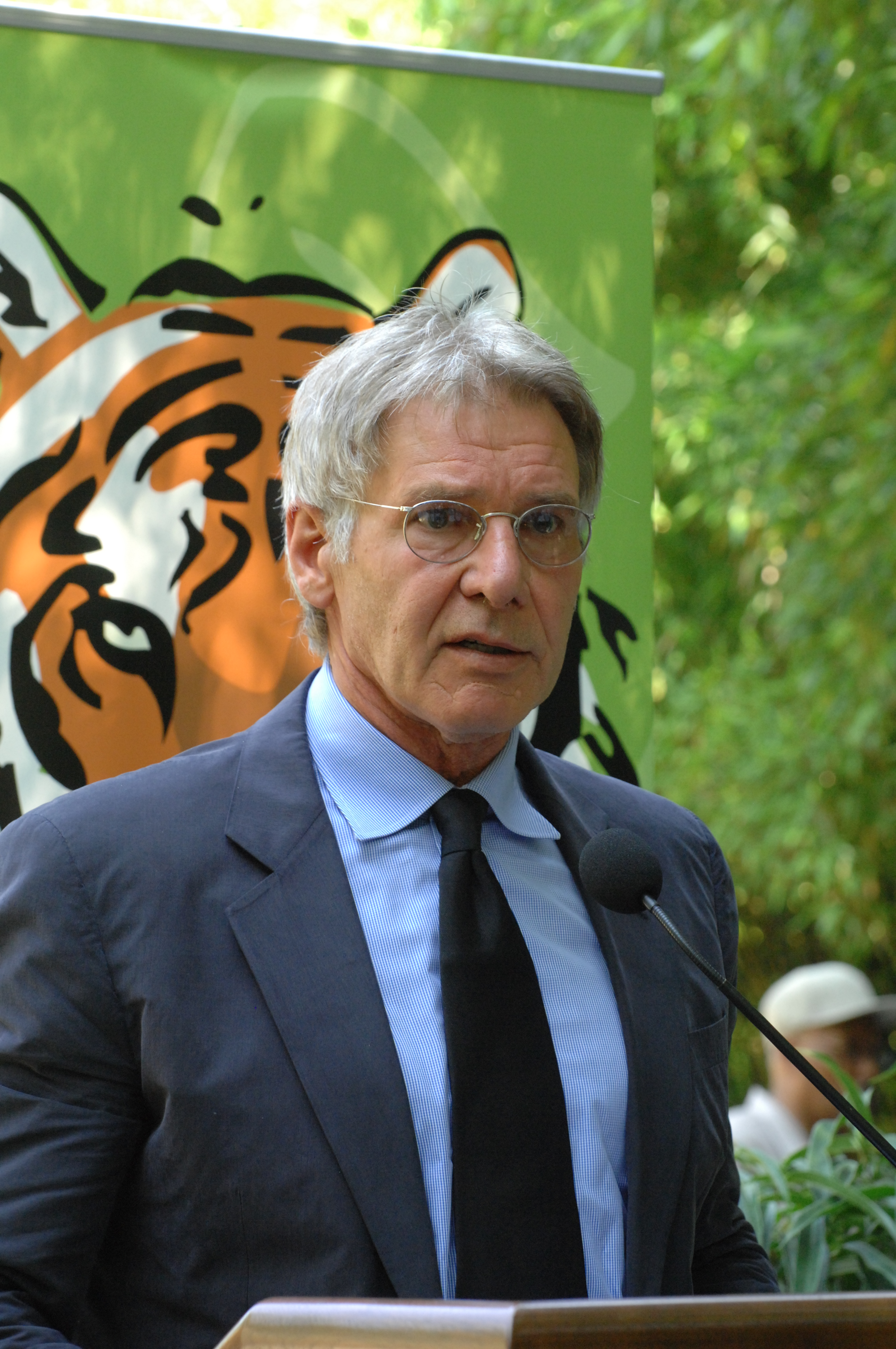
Harrison Ford, a Conservation International board member, speaking at the 2008 launch of the Tiger Conservation Initiative at the National Zoo in Washington, D.C.

Conservation International operates primarily through Conservation International Foundation, a U.S. 501(c)(3) nonprofit organization. It is governed by a board of directors and led by a chief executive officer. In February 2026, Sebastian Troëng was named chief executive officer and Lisa P. Jackson was named interim chair of the board, succeeding Robert J. Fisher; actor Harrison Ford is among the board members. CharityWatch reported that the foundation met its governance benchmarks, including an independent audit, a publicly available conflict-of-interest policy, and an independent board majority.

Beyond the U.S.-based Conservation International Foundation, CI's international network combines branch offices, field-based country programmes, and separately incorporated affiliates. CI's 2023 audited financial statements describe the organisation's foreign operations as including affiliate and branch offices, and state that a number of affiliates are separately incorporated in their respective countries but consolidated into CI's financial statements because of the oversight and financial and programmatic support provided by CI. Not all units serve the same role: some are field-based national programmes, while others function mainly as partnership or support hubs. Conservation International-Japan focuses on policy advocacy and government and corporate partnerships, whereas Conservation International Singapore began as a regional office and now supports nature markets, carbon-project development and the International Blue Carbon Institute from Singapore.

The organization's environmental and social safeguard system includes project screening and safeguard planning, including stakeholder-engagement and accountability-and-grievance plans, while its public grievance mechanism states that complaints may concern exclusion from consultations or free, prior and informed consent processes, land- or resource-use restrictions, and other project harms; many country offices maintain local intake channels in addition to the institution-level mechanism. The relevance of those procedures has been underscored by disputes over carbon projects and land use: reporting on the Alto Mayo carbon project in Peru described complaints from residents who said homes had been demolished and families pressured to leave the protected forest, while coverage of the 2013 Ranyane dispute in Botswana said residents and advocacy groups linked relocation pressure to a proposed wildlife corridor associated with Conservation International, a claim the Botswana government denied.

== Funding and financials ==
Conservation International Foundation revenue and expenses, FY2011–FY2025, in nominal U.S. dollars.

According to ProPublica's compilation of Internal Revenue Service Form 990 filings, Conservation International Foundation reported about US$271 million in revenue and about US$298 million in expenses for the fiscal year ending June 2024, compared with about US$204 million in revenue and about US$246 million in expenses for the fiscal year ending June 2023. In those filings, contributions and grants accounted for most reported revenue (91% in FY2024; 85% in FY2023), with smaller shares from investment income and other revenue.

CharityWatch's analysis of consolidated statements for fiscal year 2023 estimated that government sources accounted for 0%-24% of the foundation's cash revenue. CI has raised support through foundation grants and corporate partnerships and has managed project-based conservation finance and climate and biodiversity funding, including programs connected to the Global Environment Facility and the Green Climate Fund. Some projects have used mechanisms such as trust funds and carbon finance linked to conservation agreements and other interventions.

== Country programs and affiliates ==
Conservation International carries out much of its work through country programs and affiliated entities. The summaries below highlight country programs and affiliates; cross-border initiatives are described in Global programs and initiatives.

Conservation International local programs and regional operations listed on the organization's website.

=== Americas ===
==== Bolivia ====
Conservation International has worked in Bolivia since 1987, focusing on Amazon conservation through protected-area support and conservation-finance initiatives. In 1987 it helped implement a debt-for-nature swap described by the World Bank as the first of its kind, purchasing US$650,000 of Bolivian debt for US$100,000 and supporting protection and management funding for the Beni Biological Station Biosphere Reserve and three additional reserves. 2024 saw the creation of the Área Natural de Manejo Integrado El Gran Manupare in Sena (Pando Department), a protected area covering 452,639 hectares, with the process involving CI Bolivia’s technical team alongside local and municipal actors.

==== Brazil ====
In Brazil, Conservation International began working in 1990 through Conservation International do Brasil. In the Brazilian Amazon, it is an executing partner for the World Bank-led, Global Environment Facility-financed Amazon Sustainable Landscapes Project. Conservation International also served as the executing agency for the UNDP-GEF project Taking Deforestation Out of the Soy Supply Chain, which focused on reducing deforestation linked to soy expansion in the MATOPIBA agricultural frontier.

==== Colombia ====
Conservation International has worked in Colombia since 1991, carrying out programs that integrate conservation of natural resources with socio-economic development in partnership with government, academic, and civil-society actors. In 2004 it was among the NGOs that signed a Tropical Forest Conservation Act debt-for-nature agreement that reduced Colombia’s debt to the United States by more than US$10 million in exchange for funding tropical-forest conservation projects. In 2022, Conservation International joined partners launching Herencia Colombia, a project-finance-for-permanence initiative described as securing about US$245 million in public and private finance to support long-term management and expansion of Colombia’s protected-areas system.

==== Costa Rica ====
In Costa Rica, Conservation International has worked for more than 35 years and its country programme focuses on ocean and coastal conservation and marine spatial planning. Conservation International Costa Rica participates in the Transforma-Innova/TRANSFORMA initiative led by Deutsche Gesellschaft für Internationale Zusammenarbeit (GIZ) and partner organisations to support low-carbon and climate-resilient practices in agriculture, livestock, and marine-coastal systems. The programme also implements a pilot project under the Blue Carbon Facility of Agence française de développement (AFD) to support Costa Rica's National Blue Carbon Strategy and Action Plan, with fieldwork in mangroves in the Gulf of Nicoya.

==== Ecuador ====
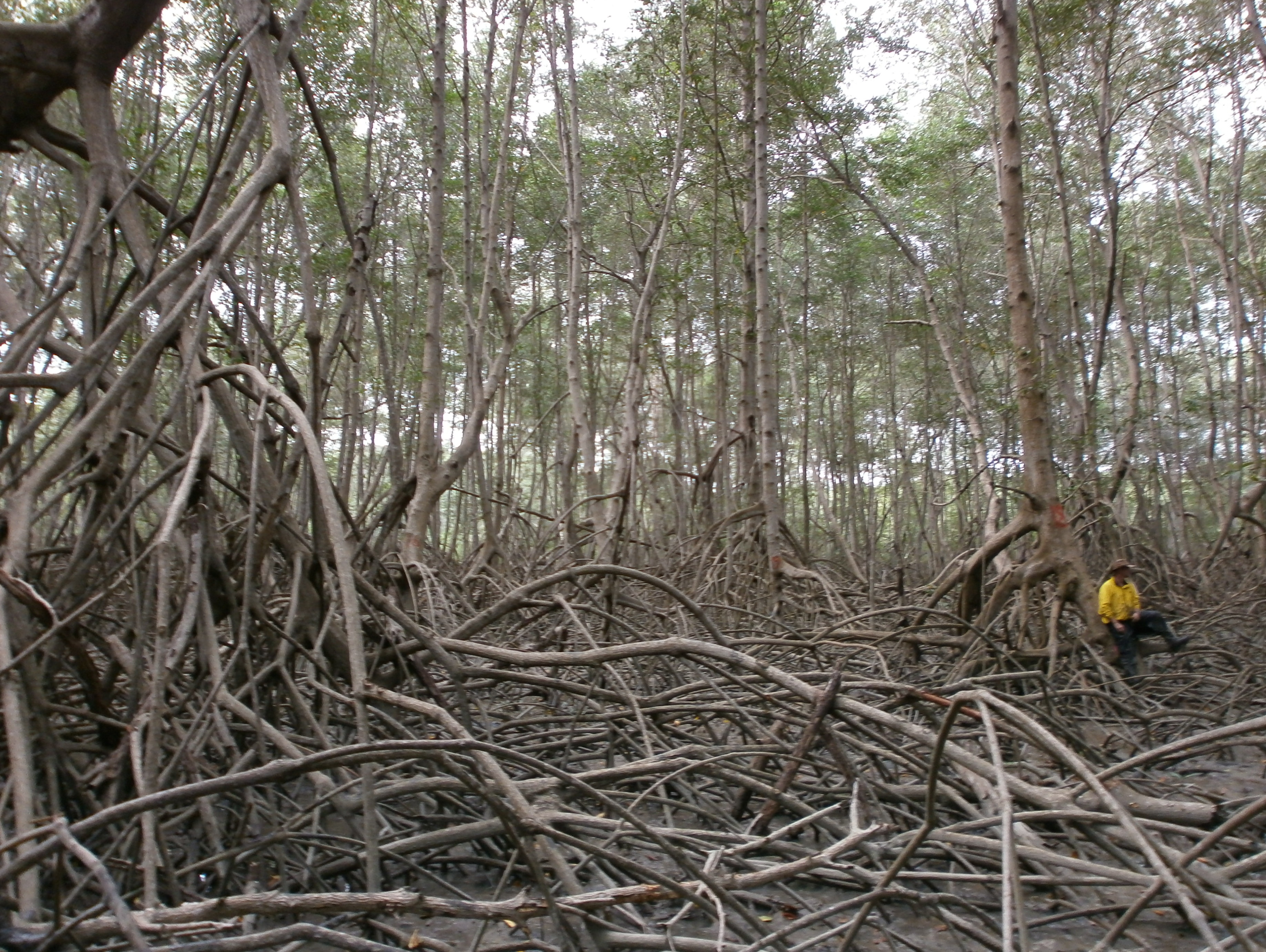
Mangrove fieldwork in Guayaquil, Ecuador.

Conservation International established its Ecuador country programme in 2001, focusing on biodiversity conservation and protected-area management in the Galápagos Islands and mainland Ecuador, including marine and coastal conservation and climate resilience. It has served as the Global Environment Facility agency for the Galápagos biosecurity and ecosystem restoration project Safeguarding biodiversity in the Galapagos Islands by enhancing biosecurity and creating the enabling environment for the restoration of Galapagos Island ecosystems. Conservation International Foundation is the accredited entity for the Green Climate Fund project Mangroves for climate: Public, Private and Community Partnerships for Mitigation and Adaptation in Ecuador, approved in July 2024.

==== Guyana ====
Conservation International has worked in Guyana since 1989, focusing on protected-area planning and community-based conservation in forest and coastal ecosystems. In the Upper Takutu-Upper Essequibo region, it has supported the Wai Wai community of Konashen (Kanashen), which was later gazetted as the Kanashen Amerindian Protected Area (about 648,567 hectares) within Guyana’s National Protected Areas System. CI-Guyana has also been involved in supporting Guyana’s REDD+ forest monitoring through the national Monitoring, Reporting & Verification System (MRVS).

==== Mexico ====
In Mexico, Conservation International has worked since 1990, with a programme that includes coastal and marine conservation and landscape restoration with local and public partners. It partnered in the USAID-supported programme Conserving Critical Coastal Ecosystems in Mexico (1996-2003), which supported site-based coastal-management initiatives in Quintana Roo and on Mexico's Pacific coast and documented capacity-building and technical exchange with Mexican NGOs, universities and government agencies. In the 2020s, Conservation International has been involved in conservation-finance initiatives linked to Mexico's biodiversity targets, including the Global Biodiversity Framework Fund project Mex30x30: Conserving Mexican biodiversity through the collective social participation approach.

==== Peru ====
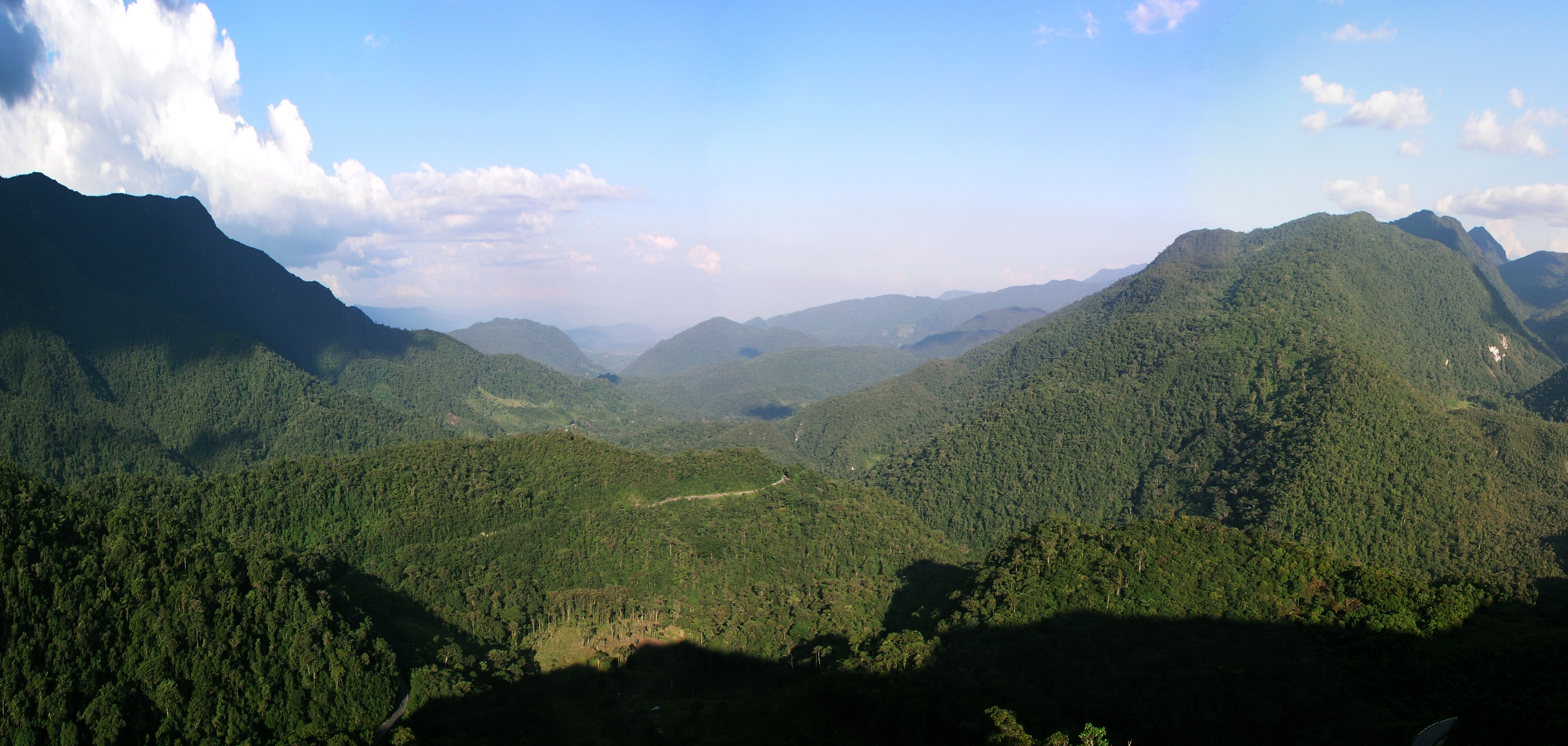
The Alto Mayo landscape in San Martín Region, Peru, where Conservation International has worked on forest conservation and conservation-finance initiatives.

Conservation International has worked in Peru since 1989, focusing on Amazon forest conservation and protected-area management alongside community livelihoods and conservation finance. In the Alto Mayo Protection Forest, it has used conservation agreements linked to voluntary-market REDD+ finance to support forest protection while providing participating households with technical assistance intended to improve livelihoods. In 2023, Peru and the United States finalised a Tropical Forest and Coral Reef Conservation Act (TFCCA) debt-for-nature swap with Conservation International and other NGOs, redirecting more than US$20 million in debt-service payments to a grantmaking fund for forest conservation and sustainable livelihoods in the Peruvian Amazon.

==== Suriname ====
In Suriname, Conservation International helped establish the Central Suriname Nature Reserve, a 1,600,000-hectare protected area created in 1998 and inscribed as a UNESCO World Heritage Site in 2000. It supported the establishment of the Suriname Conservation Foundation, a conservation trust fund created in 1999 to help finance protected-area management. Along the coast near Paramaribo, CI-Suriname and partners have worked on nature-based coastal protection at Weg naar Zee using sediment-trapping structures designed to promote mangrove regrowth and reduce erosion.

=== Africa ===
==== Botswana ====
Conservation International has worked in Botswana since 1993, with programmes focused on biodiversity conservation and community-linked natural-resource management, including work associated with the Okavango Delta. In the late 2000s, it participated in coordination and information-sharing forums associated with the Northern Botswana Human Wildlife Coexistence Project and worked with the Department of Wildlife and National Parks on the Western Kgalagadi Conservation Corridor. In the 2020s, Conservation International became the accredited entity for the Green Climate Fund project Ecosystem-Based Adaptation and Mitigation in Botswana's Communal Rangelands.

==== Kenya ====
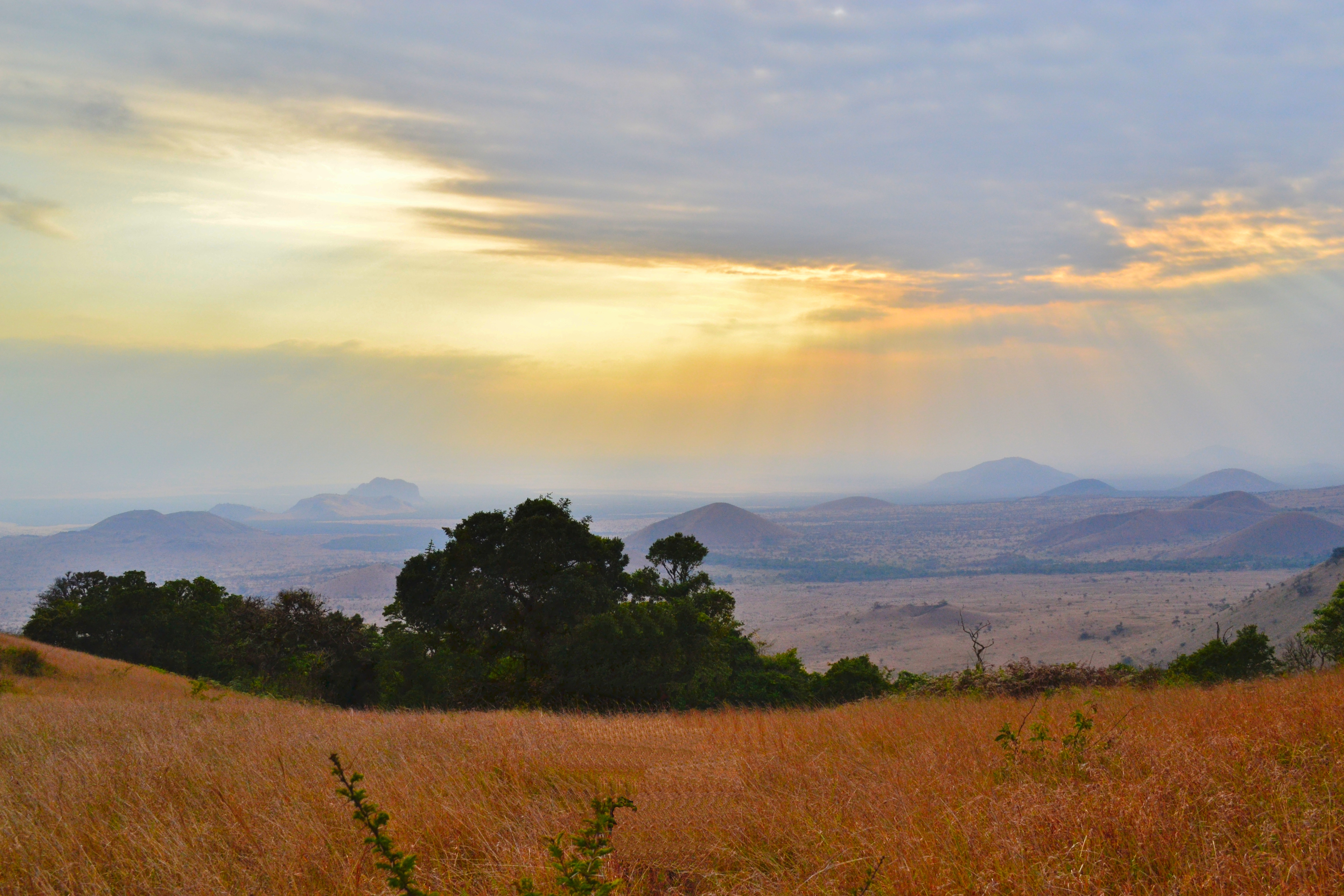
Chyulu Hills, Kenya.

Conservation International established its Kenya programme in 2014. The programme works on forest and rangeland conservation and restoration and supports climate-mitigation initiatives including REDD+. In the Chyulu Hills landscape, it has supported community-based rangeland restoration for climate resilience and pastoral livelihoods. Conservation International is the lead agency for the Global Environment Facility project Advancing human-wildlife conflict management effectiveness in Kenya through an integrated approach.

==== Liberia ====
Conservation International began working in Liberia in 2001, focusing on protected-area and landscape initiatives in the country's southeast, including work linked to Sapo National Park and the Grebo forest landscape within a wider conservation complex connected to Taï National Park in neighbouring Ivory Coast. In May 2018, Conservation International and the Government of Liberia launched the Liberia Conservation Fund, an independent conservation fund intended to provide long-term financing for Liberia's protected areas. Conservation International is the implementing agency for Liberia's Global Environment Facility Food Systems, Land Use and Restoration (FOLUR) project, which aims to reduce deforestation and restore degraded lands in a 2.5-million-hectare northwest landscape while strengthening deforestation-free cocoa and palm oil value chains.

==== Madagascar ====
In Madagascar, Conservation International has worked since 1990. The programme has focused on protected-area and forest-corridor management in eastern and south-eastern Madagascar, including the Ambositra–Vondrozo Forest Corridor (COFAV) and the Ankeniheny-Zahamena Corridor (CAZ). CAZ links Zahamena National Park and Andasibe-Mantadia National Park and covers about 425,000 hectares (4,250 km^{2}); a carbon-finance component was designed to generate verified emission reductions to help fund management costs and expand local livelihood opportunities. In 2016, the Green Climate Fund approved Sustainable Landscapes in Eastern Madagascar, with Conservation International Foundation as the accredited entity.

==== South Africa ====
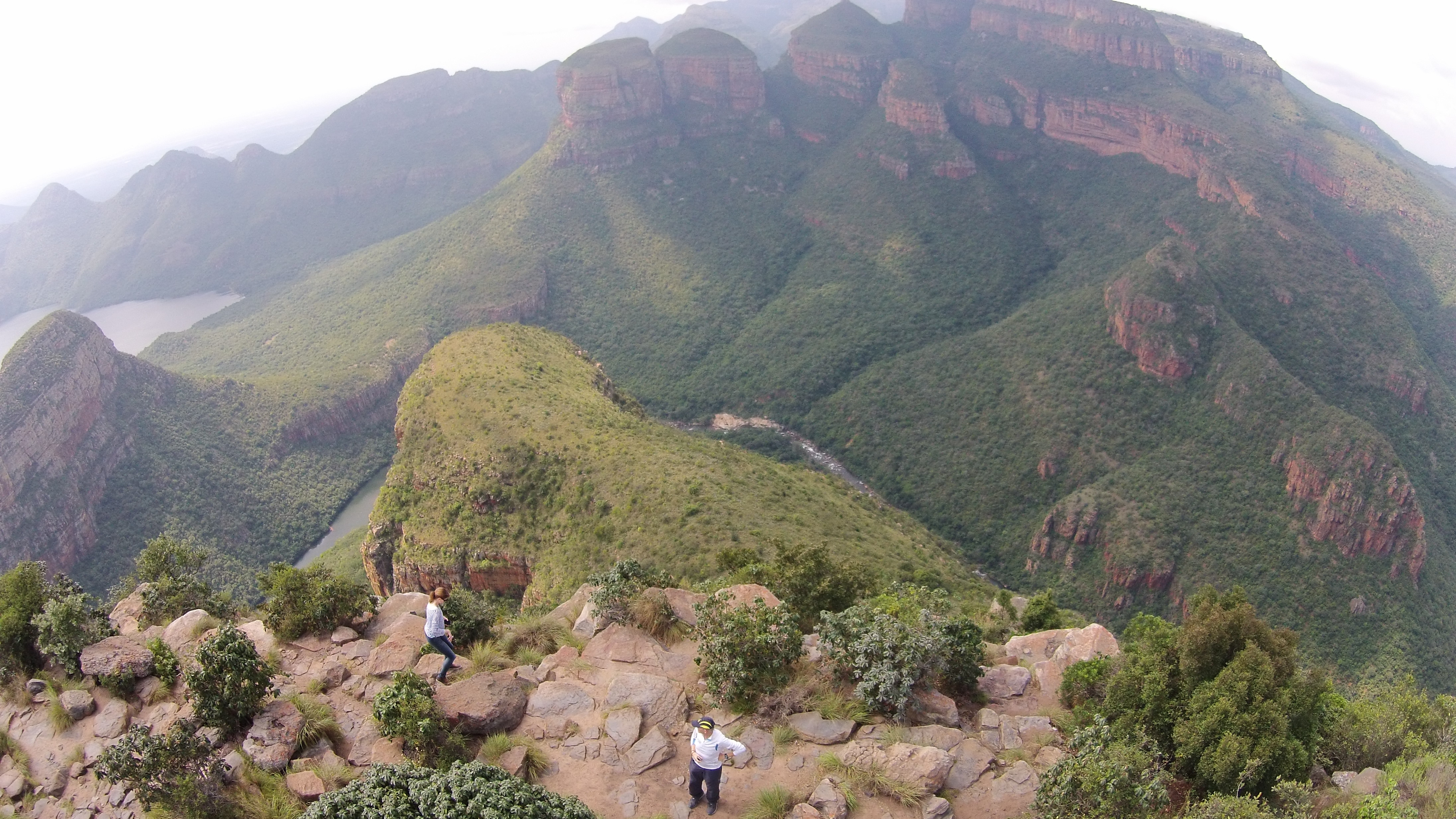
Blyde River Canyon, part of the Kruger to Canyons Biosphere Region, South Africa.

Conservation South Africa (CSA) is an independent affiliate of Conservation International established in 2010 and registered in South Africa as a Section 18A public benefit organisation. CSA supports rural economic development linked to biodiversity conservation, including sustainable veld management and grazing practices, and works with partners in landscapes such as Namakwa, the Eastern Grasslands and the Kruger to Canyons Biosphere Region. Under the Mega Living Landscapes programme, CSA participates in collaborative platforms and implements landscape-planning, community, and durable-finance components, including work in the Namakwa and Eastern Grasslands landscapes and sustainable grazing initiatives in the Eastern Cape.

=== Asia–Pacific ===
==== Australia ====
In Australia, Conservation International operates through the Conservation International Australia Environmental Trust, a registered charity (since 2021) endorsed as a Deductible gift recipient from 1 January 2024. Through Mastercard’s Priceless Planet Coalition, Conservation International has supported Greening Australia’s forest-restoration plantings in New South Wales and Victoria, with 430,000 biodiverse native trees rolling out across the 2021–2022 planting seasons.

==== Cambodia ====
In Cambodia, Conservation International has worked since 2001 on forest conservation and protected-area management, including implementation of the Central Cardamom Protected Forest project with Cambodia’s Forestry Administration from July 2001 to September 2004. In the Prey Lang Wildlife Sanctuary landscape, a REDD+ project registered under Japan's Joint Crediting Mechanism became operational in 2018 and is jointly implemented with Cambodia’s Ministry of Environment and Mitsui.

==== China ====
Conservation International began working in China in 2002, with early programme activity focused on mountain landscapes in southwest China (including parts of Yunnan and Sichuan). In the mid-2000s, the programme implemented activities linked to the Critical Ecosystem Partnership Fund (CEPF) and supported biodiversity surveys, conservation monitoring, and training for local and government staff, alongside community-based conservation and restoration work. In Yunnan, it contributed to a payments-for-ecosystem-services pilot at and around the Lashihai Nature Reserve near Lijiang, testing compensation and incentive mechanisms linked to watershed services and conservation objectives.

==== Fiji ====
Conservation International began working in Fiji in 2003, supporting biodiversity conservation and protected-area initiatives. A flagship effort has been support for the establishment of the Sovi Basin Conservation Area on Viti Levu, including development of a management plan and conservation-lease arrangements with landowners and partner institutions. In 2005, landowners agreed to cancel a proposed logging concession in the Sovi Basin, and a conservation trust fund was developed to support long-term management and provide alternative income for landowners.

==== Indonesia ====
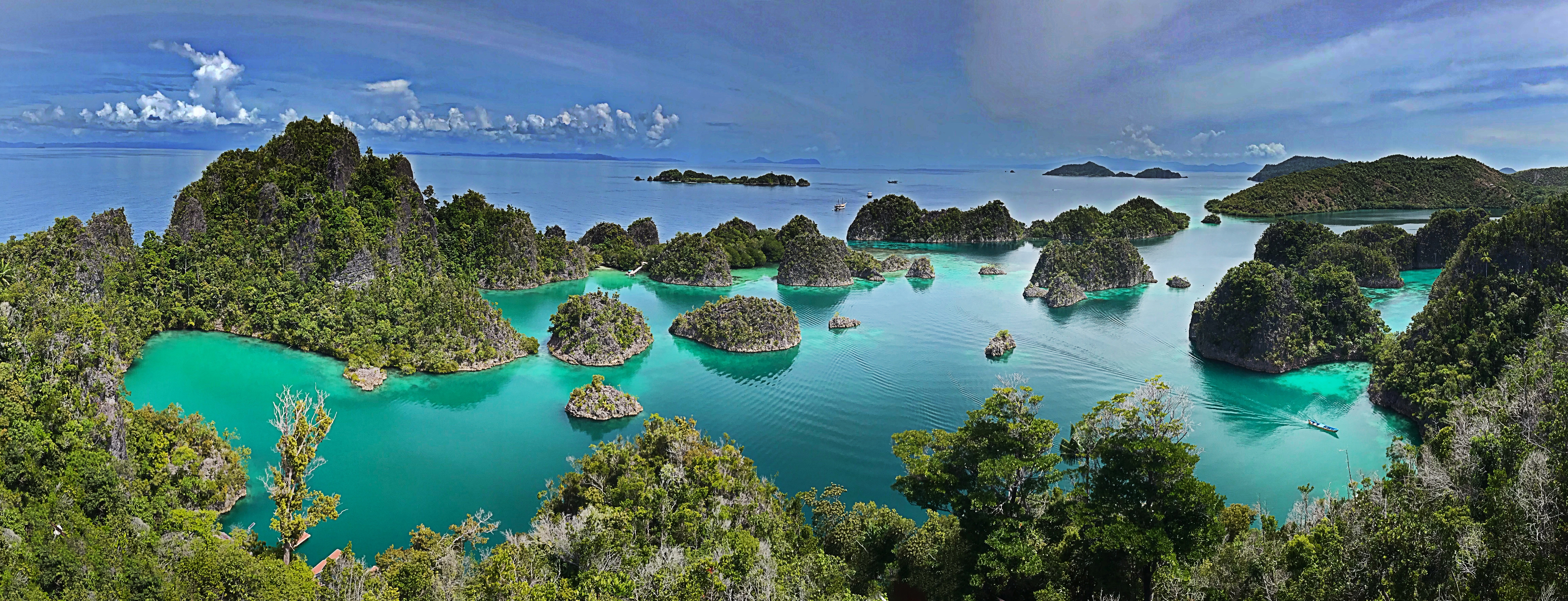
Piaynemo in Raja Ampat, Indonesia, part of the Bird's Head Seascape region.

In Indonesia, Conservation International has worked since 2004, when it led a coalition that launched the Bird's Head Seascape Initiative in the Bird's Head Peninsula region of West Papua. In the Raja Ampat marine protected area network, conservation work has included a tourism entrance fee system and a community-based patrol system, alongside long-term financing planning through the Blue Abadi Fund administered by the Indonesian Biodiversity Foundation (Yayasan Keanekaragaman Hayati Indonesia; KEHATI). In 2024, a U.S.–Indonesia debt-for-nature swap targeted funding for conservation work in the Bird's Head Seascape and the Lesser Sunda–Banda seascape, including a contribution from Conservation International.

==== Japan ====
Conservation International Japan has worked on environmental conservation and policy advocacy since 1990, with activities including global conservation partnerships, advice to government and corporate partners, and work on sustainability and nature-related commitments. Activities described for the programme include helping facilitate Japan's membership in the Critical Ecosystem Partnership Fund and supporting the establishment of Japan's first Key Biodiversity Areas in 2010. Conservation International Japan was also an executing agency for the GEF-Satoyama Project, a Global Environment Facility project on biodiversity conservation and sustainable management in priority socio-ecological production landscapes and seascapes. In 2018, Conservation International Japan began a project with Mitsui & Co. in Cambodia's Prey Lang Wildlife Sanctuary, linked to local management support, alternative livelihoods and carbon-credit finance under Japan's Joint Crediting Mechanism.

==== New Caledonia ====
In New Caledonia, Conservation International established a local office in 2002, building on partnerships with the North Province that began in the 1990s. Work has included a co-management conservation project around the Mont Panié reserve area initiated in 2003 with local partners (including the Dayu Biik association), alongside early invasive-mammal control trials begun in 2004.

==== New Zealand (Aotearoa) ====
In New Zealand (Aotearoa), Conservation International works through Conservation International Aotearoa, which supports iwi and Māori-led ocean initiatives and Pacific partnerships, including the Hinemoana Halo initiative. Work in Aotearoa New Zealand has included policy research on coastal wetland blue carbon, including analysis related to blue-carbon crediting and market development. New Zealand’s Department of Conservation has partnered with Manta Watch NZ and Conservation International Aotearoa on research related to oceanic manta rays in New Zealand waters.

==== Philippines ====
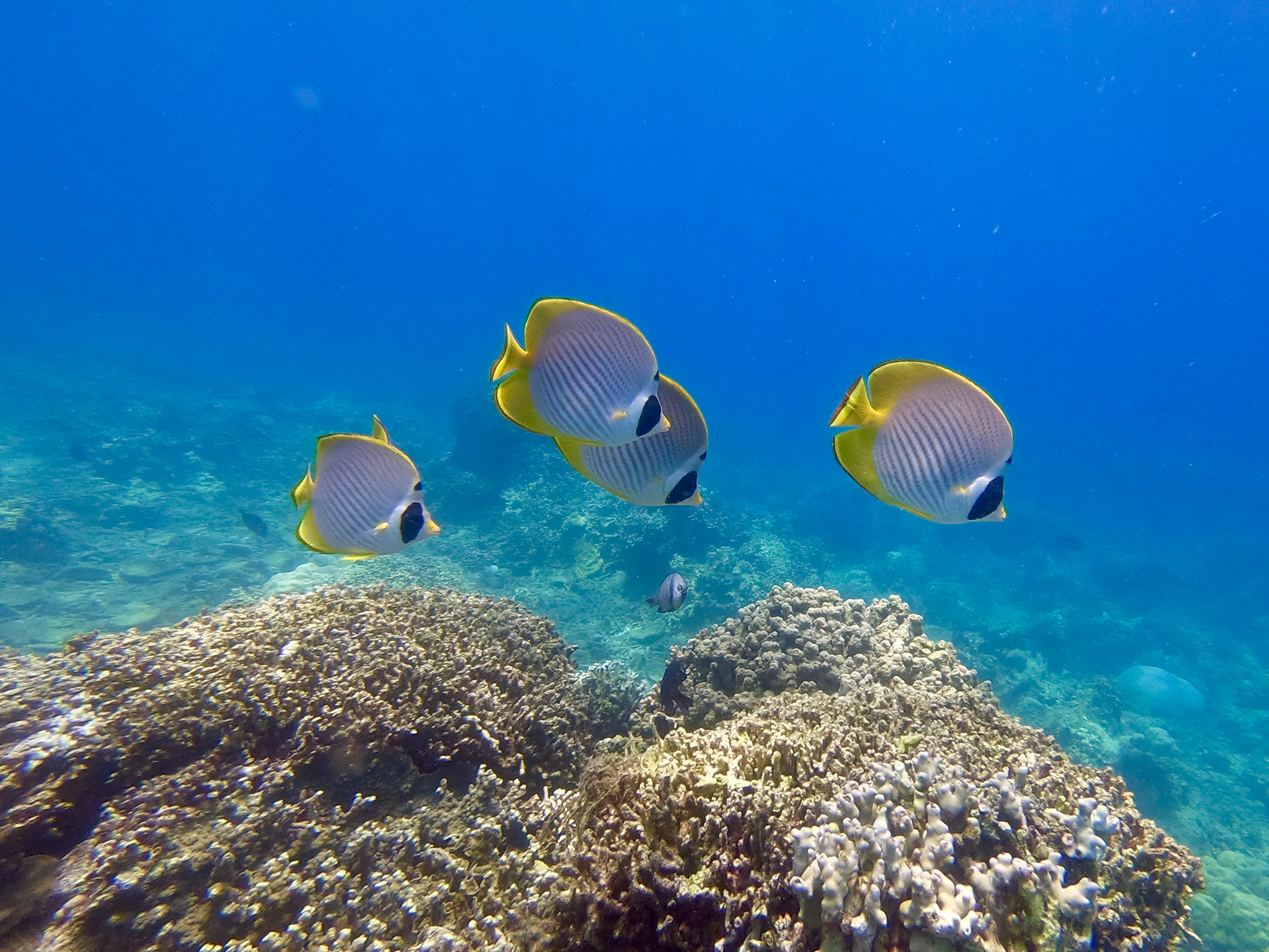
Coral reef at Verde Island National Marine Reserve, Philippines.

Conservation International began working in the Philippines in 1995. Its programme combines terrestrial conservation in Palawan (including work associated with the Mount Mantalingahan protected landscape) with marine conservation and fisheries-management initiatives in priority seascapes such as the Verde Island Passage. From 2008 to 2011, it supported local-government alliances coordinating a network of 69 marine protected areas protecting about 17,000 hectares (170 km^{2}) in the Verde Island Passage, and it was a local partner for the United Nations Development Programme project Strengthening the Marine Protected Area System to Conserve Marine Key Biodiversity Areas (Smart Seas Philippines) (2014–2020).

==== Samoa ====
Conservation International has worked in Samoa since 2006, focusing on ocean planning and marine conservation. In June 2025, Samoa legally adopted the Samoa Marine Spatial Plan, establishing nine fully protected marine protected areas covering 36,000 km^{2} (14,000 sq mi) and setting a target to fully protect 30% of Samoa’s ocean area while sustainably managing the remainder.

==== Singapore ====
Conservation International Singapore operates as a Singapore-based programme and support hub rather than a primarily site-based country programme. Conservation International was established in Singapore in 2009 as a regional office and later registered the Conservation International Singapore Conservation Trust; the trust received Institution of Public Character status in 2017. Its work includes policy advice and finance for nature-based solutions, support for nature markets, and Asia-Pacific carbon project development through the Asia-Pacific Carbon Team. The International Blue Carbon Institute, based in Singapore, functions as a hub for blue-carbon research, implementation, capacity-building and practitioner exchange, with support from the Singapore Economic Development Board, Amazon, and other funders.

==== Timor-Leste ====
In Timor-Leste, Conservation International has been involved in protected-area and marine-conservation planning since at least 2009, when it was listed in a government planning report on the Nino Konis Santana National Park area. In 2018, it was listed as the implementing agency for a Global Environment Facility-financed project intended to establish a national protected-area network and improve natural resource management in priority catchment corridors. Conservation International–led reef surveys around Atauro Island have also been used in proposals to create a marine protected area for the island’s waters.

== Reception and criticism ==
Conservation International has faced criticism in media and from advocacy organizations regarding aspects of its project implementation and its engagement with corporate partners.

=== Papua New Guinea project spending allegations ===
In 2008, Conservation International faced criticism over its role in the Milne Bay Community Based Coastal and Marine Conservation Project in Milne Bay Province, Papua New Guinea. In a report for The Nation, journalist Mark Dowie wrote that within four years the project's US$6,443,022 budget had been spent largely on staff costs, vehicles and boats, travel, and overhead rather than on conservation activities, and that a UNDP project evaluation reported that between US$800,000 and US$1.2 million was unaccounted for. Conservation International disputed the UNDP figure, said it had contributed US$2.3 million to the project, and denied financial impropriety while inviting a forensic audit. A later UNDP project document described the Milne Bay project as having been wound up early amid "fiscal and political controversy".

=== Undercover investigation and corporate partnerships ===
In May 2011, the magazine Don't Panic published an undercover video of a meeting in which its reporters, posing as executives from defense contractor Lockheed Martin, discussed potential collaboration with Conservation International on corporate engagement and communications, including participation in a business forum and the use of an "endangered species mascot" in branding. Some environmental advocates argued that the episode illustrated how corporate partnerships could provide reputational benefits to companies. In response, CI vice president Justin Ward told HuffPost that the video was misleading and not representative of CI's interactions with corporate partners, and said the organization did not offer image-management services and required potential partners to undergo a due diligence process. Ward also said corporate partnerships accounted for less than 10% of CI's budget and argued that working with companies could be appropriate when relationships were transparent and funds were directed to conservation programs.

=== Botswana corridor dispute ===
In 2013, Survival International and Botswana's Khwedom Council said that Basarwa (San) residents of the Ranyane settlement in Ghanzi District were being pressured to relocate. They linked the dispute to proposals for the Western Kgalagadi Conservation Corridor, a wildlife corridor project that News24 reported had been developed with Conservation International. The Guardian Sun reported that the matter was before the High Court and subject to an interdict halting relocations; government spokesperson Jeff Ramsay denied that residents were being forced to move and said that relocations involved only households that had requested assistance.

=== Alto Mayo Conservation Initiative in Peru ===
In December 2021, Sapiens magazine reported similar issues in Peru. At the Alto Mayo Conservation Initiative in Peru, CI had brokered the sale of carbon credits created from preserving forest land to the Disney Company to offset their cruise ships' activities. While approximately half of the local farming families signed on to preserve the forest in exchange for economic development programs funded by CI, some wanted to retain the right to expand their farms and engage in logging in the forest, leading to violence against Park rangers from the Peruvian National Service of Natural Protected Areas (SERNANP) and the threat of evictions. Local members of the Rondero autonomous peasants group told reporters that 50 homes in the forest were demolished in 2021, while SERNANP reported that none of the homes were currently inhabited. Conservation International stated that the demolitions were not funded by carbon credit revenues.

== Notable people ==
- Johan Rockström – Chief scientist.
- Lü Zhi – Conservation biologist; has worked with Conservation International since 2002.
- Melanie Stiassny – Ichthyologist; served as director of Conservation International's Center for Applied Biodiversity Science.
- Russell Mittermeier – Primatologist; served as President of Conservation International.
- Anthony Rylands – Primatologist; senior research scientist at Conservation International.
- Gerald R. Allen – Ichthyologist; served as science team leader in Conservation International's Coral Reef Conservation Program (1997–2003) and as director of a marine rapid-assessment program (2004–2005).
