= Lü Zhi (conservationist) =

Giant panda expert and Chinese conservationist (born 1965)

Lü Zhi (Chinese: 吕植; pinyin: Lǚ Zhí; born 1965) is a Chinese conservation biologist, panda expert and an expert on biodiversity. She is a professor at Peking University and also the executive director of the Peking University Center for Nature and Society. Lü is also the founder of the Shanshui Conservation Center which is dedicated to preserving the Three Rivers Headwater Region in Yushu, Qinghai.

== Biography ==
Lü began studying at Peking University in 1981, when she was sixteen. By 1992, she had completed all of her undergraduate and post-doctorate work at the same university. Her work with giant pandas began when she was nineteen, when she became part of a long-term field study on the animals, their habitat and their genetic diversity. During her field work, she created bonds with some of the pandas, helped a sick panda eat again and also became one of the first people to go inside of a wild panda's den. She also taught herself the skill of wildlife-photography while in the field, and her pictures were featured in National Geographic in 1993 and 1995.

From 1995 to 2000, she worked as a program office for the World Wildlife Fund (WWF) China. At WWF, she developed programs and activities which focused on the giant panda and also on the Tibetan Autonomous Region. She also helped to open the WWF Tibet office and to raise the total annual budget for conservation focusing on the panda and Tibet. In 2002, she began to work at Conservation International (CI). Lü Zhi worked as the head of CI's China office.

Lü's conservation work focuses on several large endangered species, including the giant panda, snow leopard, Przewalski's gazelle and the Tibetan brown bear. Her non-governmental organization (NGO), the Shanshui Conservation Center was founded in 2007 in order to help develop "community-based, grassroots solutions to conservation in western China." She emphasizes the importance of community-managed nature reserves in the fight to protect species and habitats, saying that these types of models are of benefit to both animals and sustainable use of the land by people. Lü Zhi hopes to see a "new economic system that recognises and pays for the value of nature" and at Shan Shui, they model these kinds of economic systems for the larger Chinese government. In addition to research and developing community-based conservation efforts, she has also worked with the Chinese government and businesses in order to develop more environmentally-friendly legislation and practices.

Lü has written and co-authored several books about science. Her book, Giant Pandas in the Wild (2002), was called "a work of art" by Library Journal.

Additional information Dr. Lü Zhi, a conservationist from China, graduated from the Department of Biology at Peking University in 1985, marking the beginning of her journey in nature conservation. Since the age of 19, she has demonstrated her interest in studying nature, particularly focusing on research related to giant pandas and endangered animals. She has even spent most of her time living among the pandas, forming friendships with them, and providing care for their illnesses. Through interviews with Dr. Lü's colleagues, it is evident that she is a hardworking, straightforward, and equitable teacher. Even when her students hesitate in the face of difficulties, she criticizes and encourages them to overcome challenges. At the same time, Dr. Lü feels guilty for spending too much time on research and not enough time teaching her students. She also expresses remorse that her conservation efforts are not sufficient to offset human destruction of the environment, yet she continues to strive for environmental protection. Additionally, she is the founder of the Shanshui Conservation Center and serves as the Vice President of the China Women's Association for Science and Technology. Dr. Lü is known for her pioneering work in community-based conservation and citizen sciences, advocating for coexistence between humans and nature through economic, cultural, and policy initiatives. She also plays an active role in shaping conservation policy at regional, national, and international levels. Furthermore, she has authored numerous articles and books related to conservation and is recognized globally for her contributions. In 2007, she established the Shanshui Conservation Center, focusing on grassroots conservation solutions in western China, and has been involved in significant field projects on various endangered species. Her research on the giant panda led her to a deeper study of the Sacred Lakes and Mountains in the Tibetan region, providing insights into Tibetan Buddhist conservation practices. In high-altitude forest areas, the climate is extremely cold and the housing conditions are very harsh and rudimentary. At that time, people would not have thought that a woman could overcome difficulties and spend eight years in the wilderness. Many people thought that Lü Zhi was only conducting research on pandas, but in reality, Lü had already developed a strong friendship with the pandas. Lü also took photos with the pandas, documenting their wonderful moments and stories together, which further earned people's respect for this woman. After conducting research, Lü Zhi and her classmates published the world's first comprehensive studies of the giant pandas living in the wild in the Qinling Mountains. In their paper, they discussed the significant impact of human activities such as logging and farming on the giant panda's habitat. Fortunately, as a result of this research, logging activities have been halted and China has established a new nature reserve in the Qinling Mountains. It is noteworthy that Lü Zhi and four other women have been awarded the "Chinese Young Women in Science Fellowship," further highlighting the role of women in scientific development. When facing challenges in her research and societal doubts about women's abilities, Dr. Lü expressed, "I am only enjoying what I do."
