= Luzhi, Vladimir Oblast =

Village in Russia

Luzhi Лужи
- Village
- Location within Vladimir Oblast Location within Russia
- Coordinates: 55°24′N 41°39′E
- Country: Russia
- Region: Vladimir Oblast
- District: Melenkovsky District
- Time zone: UTC+3:00

Luzhi (Russian: Лужи) is a rural locality (a village) in Denyatinskoye Rural Settlement, Melenkovsky District, Vladimir Oblast, Russia. The population was 24 as of 2010.

== Geography ==
Luzhi is located 23 km northeast of Melenki (the district's administrative centre) by road. Turgenevo is the nearest rural locality.
