= Debt-for-nature swap =

Exchange of foreign debt for investments

Debt-for-nature swaps are financial transactions in which a portion of a developing nation's foreign debt is forgiven in exchange for local investments in environmental conservation measures.

== History ==
The debt-for-nature swaps concept was first given birth by Thomas Lovejoy of the World Wildlife Fund in 1987 as an opportunity to deal with the problems of developing-nation indebtedness and its consequent deleterious effect on the environment. In the wake of the Latin American debt crisis that resulted in steep reductions to the environmental conservation ability of highly indebted nations, Lovejoy suggested that ameliorating debt and promoting conservation could be done at the same time. Since the first swap occurred between Conservation International and Bolivia in 1987, many national governments and conservation organizations have engaged in debt-for-nature swaps. Most swaps occur in tropical countries, which contain many diverse species of flora and fauna. Also, countries that have engaged in debt-for-nature swaps typically have several threatened or endangered species, experience rapid deforestation, and have relatively stable, often democratic, political systems. Since 1987, debt-for-nature agreements have generated over US$1 billion for conservation in developing countries.

== Process ==
The financing mechanism for debt-for-nature swaps is an agreement among the funder(s), the national government of the debtor country, and the conservation organization(s) using the funds. The national government of the indebted country agrees to a payment schedule on the amount of the debt forgiven, usually paid through the nation’s central bank, in local currency or ponds. The process is shown in Figure 1. Participation in debt-for-nature swaps has been restricted primarily to countries where the risk of default on debt payments is high. In these circumstances, the funder can purchase the debt at well below its face value.

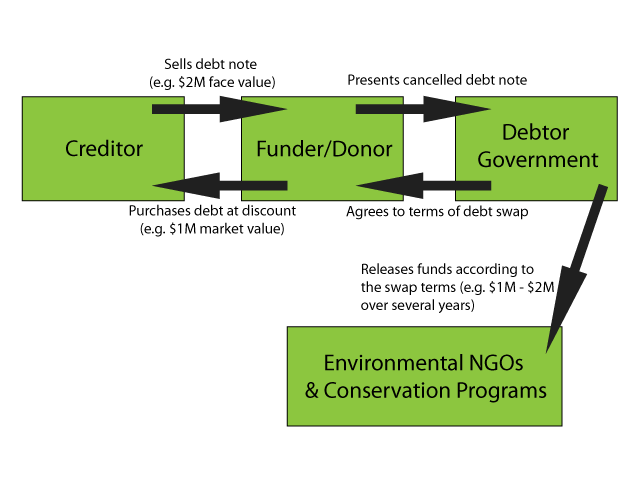
Figure 1: The general mechanics of a debt-for-nature swap.

== Types ==
In a commercial debt-for-nature swap or three-party debt-for-nature swap, a non-governmental organization (NGO) acts as the funder/donor and purchases debt titles from commercial banks on the secondary market. Since the late 1980s, organizations such as Conservation International, The Nature Conservancy, and the World Wildlife Fund have participated in international debt-for-nature swaps. The NGO transfers the debt title to the debtor country, and in exchange the country agrees to either enact certain environmental policies or endow a government bond in the name of a conservation organization, with the aim of funding conservation programs. In total, recorded third-party debt-for-nature swaps have generated nearly US$140 million in conservation funding from 1987-2010 (see Table 1).

Bilateral debt-for-nature swaps take place between two governments. In a bilateral swap, a creditor country forgives a portion of the public bilateral debt of a debtor nation in exchange for environmental commitments from that country. An example of a bilateral swap occurred when the U.S. Government, under the Enterprise for the Americas Initiative, forgave a portion of Jamaica's official debt obligations and allowed the payments on the balance to go into national funds that finance environmental conservation. These funds established the Environmental Foundation of Jamaica in 1993. Multilateral debt-for-nature swaps are similar to bilateral swaps but involve international transactions of more than two national governments. Recorded bilateral and multilateral debt-for-nature swaps have generated nearly US$900 million in total conservation funding from 1987-2010 (see Table 1). A closely related form of debt swap is a debt-for-efficiency swap.

== Participation and yields ==
The following table shows the countries which have received funds from swaps and the total recorded funds generated by each kind of swap.

Table 1. Recorded DFNS Transactions by Country, Conservation Funds Generated, 1987-2010 (Millions US$)
Country	Three-party Swap Funding	Non-US Bilateral and Multilateral Swap Funding	US Bilateral Swap Funding	Total
Argentina			$3.1	$3.1
Bangladesh			$8.5	$8.5
Belize			$9.0	$9.0
Bolivia	$3.1	$9.6	$21.8	$34.5
Botswana			$8.3	$8.3
Brazil	$2.2			$2.2
Bulgaria		$16.2		$16.2
Cameroon		$25.0		$25.0
Chile			$18.7	$18.7
Colombia		$12.0	$51.6	$63.6
Costa Rica	$42.9	$43.3	$26.0	$112.2
Dominican Republic	$0.6			$0.6
Ecuador	$7.4	$10.8		$18.2
Egypt		$29.6		$29.6
El Salvador		$6.0	$55.2	$61.2
Ghana	$1.1			$1.1
Guatemala	$1.4		$24.4	$25.8
Guinea Bissau		$0.4		$0.4
Honduras		$21.4		$21.4
Indonesia			$30.0	$30.0
Jamaica	$0.4		$37.5	$37.9
Jordan		$45.5		$45.5
Madagascar	$30.9	$14.8		$45.8
Mexico	$4.2	$0.0		$4.2
Nicaragua		$2.7		$2.7
Nigeria	$0.1			$0.1
Panama			$20.9	$20.9
Paraguay			$7.4	$7.4
Peru	$12.2	$52.7	$58.4	$123.3
Philippines	$29.1	$21.9	$8.3	$59.3
Poland	$0.1	$141.0		$141.1
Syria		$15.9		$15.9
Tanzania		$18.7		$18.7
Tunisia		$1.6		$1.6
Uruguay			$7.0	$7.0
Vietnam		$10.4		$10.4
Zambia	$2.5			$2.5
Total by Swap Type	$138.1	$499.6	$396.2	$1,033.9

=== Funders ===
Nature Conservancy, Leonardo DiCaprio Foundation, Oak Foundation and Global Environment Facility have previously provided funds to pay to the debts.

== Benefits ==
Debt for nature swaps have often been described as agreements in which all parties benefit and that there are no disadvantages. The benefits to the debtor country, creditor, and conservation organizations are outlined below.

=== For debtors ===
Through a debt-for-nature swap, a debtor country reduces its total outstanding external debt. The debtor country is able to buy back part of its debt in more favorable terms and pay for conservation initiatives rather than debt service. This leads to higher international purchasing power for the debtor country. Also, some argue that converting outstanding debts in USD to local currency debts lowers the long-term debt burden on developing countries. Additionally, debt-for-nature terms enable long-term planning and funding.

If the country is interested in funding conservation, debt-for-nature swaps provide an additional source of funds for that purpose. In contrast to debt-for-equity swaps, debt-for-nature swaps do not compromise national sovereignty since no property exchange takes place.

Environmental benefits to the debtor country include but are not limited to:

- promoting responsible resource use
- helping to preserve biodiversity
- maintaining ecosystem services
- reducing deforestation

Investment in conservation also demonstrates economic returns. For example, Costa Rica has put debt-for-nature funds to good use in establishing and improving parks and preserves, and it has seen marked improvements in tourism, improved water quality, and increased energy output even in the short term.

=== For creditors ===
Creditors see debt-for-nature swaps as a method to rid themselves of high-risk claims. By selling the debt claim, they can re-invest the proceeds from the sale in higher-performing ventures. Creditors faced with low-performance loans may also seek to limit their exposure, that is, to avoid further lending to debtor countries until their loans are serviced.

=== For conservation organizations ===
Debt-for-nature agreements are a long-term source of funding for conservation initiatives, so both international organizations acting as donors and local organizations using funds are able to further their goals of conservation. The donor organizations also purchase the debt at a value below its face value and usually redeem it above its market value. In this way, swaps are thought to generate conservation funds at a discount.

== Decline ==
The decline in the number of debt-for-nature swaps in recent years likely results in part from the higher prices of commercial debt in secondary markets. In the late 1980s and early 1990s, conservation organizations could purchase relatively large debt obligations on the secondary market at highly discounted rates. During this period, conservation organizations and national governments negotiated swaps at a rate of approximately five agreements per year. Since 2000, the number of swap agreements has dropped to about two per year. Additionally, other agreements for debt restructuring and cancellation, such as the Heavily Indebted Poor Countries (HIPC) initiative, lower a developing country’s debt obligation by much more than the relatively small contribution debt-for-nature swaps make. Also, debt-for-nature swaps have undergone thorough critique by skeptics; these criticisms may have contributed to the decline of the debt-for-nature financing mechanism.

== Criticism ==
=== Overstated financial benefits ===
Debt-for-nature swaps produce only minor debt reductions and generate far less funding than the face value of the debt purchased in the secondary market. The amount of public debt relieved by debt-for-nature swaps, even in the countries that participate in swaps regularly, accounts for less than 1% of total external debt. Also, if the indebted country does not engage in conservation in the absence of a debt-for-nature agreement, the swap may not provide the indebted country a social welfare improvement or any fiscal space in the national budget. The government of the indebted country is still responsible for payment of the debt, albeit to a conservation organization rather than to the creditor. Also, the funds produced through the agreement may replace other forms of aid, debt assistance, or conservation funding.

=== Misdirection of funds ===
Critics of debt-for-nature swaps argue that they do not generate funds where the needs are greatest. Early in the history of debt-for-nature swaps, nearly three-quarters of the total funds generated went to Costa Rica, while other countries with needs equal to or exceeding those of Costa Rica did not receive any. Brazil, for example, has had limited involvement in debt-for-nature swaps though it has experienced rapid deforestation.

=== Environmental degradation and external debt ===
Research has shown that debt relief alone does not spur environmental conservation. Though debt shows a positive correlation with deforestation levels, most researchers believe that highly indebted countries lack political institutions and enforcement structures that would limit environmental degradation. Heavily indebted countries may engage in high levels of deforestation due to shortsighted policies. Some suggest that the solutions to environmental degradation are effective political institutions, democracy, property rights, and market structures, and this development theory matches many of the principles of the Washington Consensus. Others suggest that primarily wealth creation and increased income have a positive impact on environmental conservation. This approach considers an environmental Kuznets curve, by which environmental degradation increases, reaches a tipping point, then decreases as income or wealth increases.

=== Insufficient funding of environmental protection ===
Ultimately, the responsibility of conservation lies with the local non-governmental organization implementing the protection measures. Debt-for-nature swaps are only effective when the conservation organizations are respected by local residents, have a good financial management capacity, and have a good relationship with government and other non-governmental organizations.

=== Impacts on the poor ===
Debt for nature swaps are usually actioned by an indebted nation's elite, not the peasantry who may traditionally have owned or at least used the land in question. Land rights are often expressed in different ways and ownership takes many forms. Some early debt-for-nature swaps tended to overlook the people living on the land set aside for conservation. Subsequent swaps have sought to include local residents, especially indigenous peoples, in the decision making process and the management of lands. Although "seeking" to include does not mean that local residents have been included. Reports of recent debt swap cases in Madagascar, for instance, indicate local resentment towards conservation projects.

=== Meddling in the internal affairs ===
It was feared that the however well-intentioned environmental protection programs could be perceived as meddlesome and imperialistic. The establishment of national parks in Africa has in some cases led to the impoverishment and displacement of local populations. This kind of intervention was labeled as environmental or eco-colonialism.

== See also ==
- Green Imperialism
