= Peter Seligmann =

US conservationist

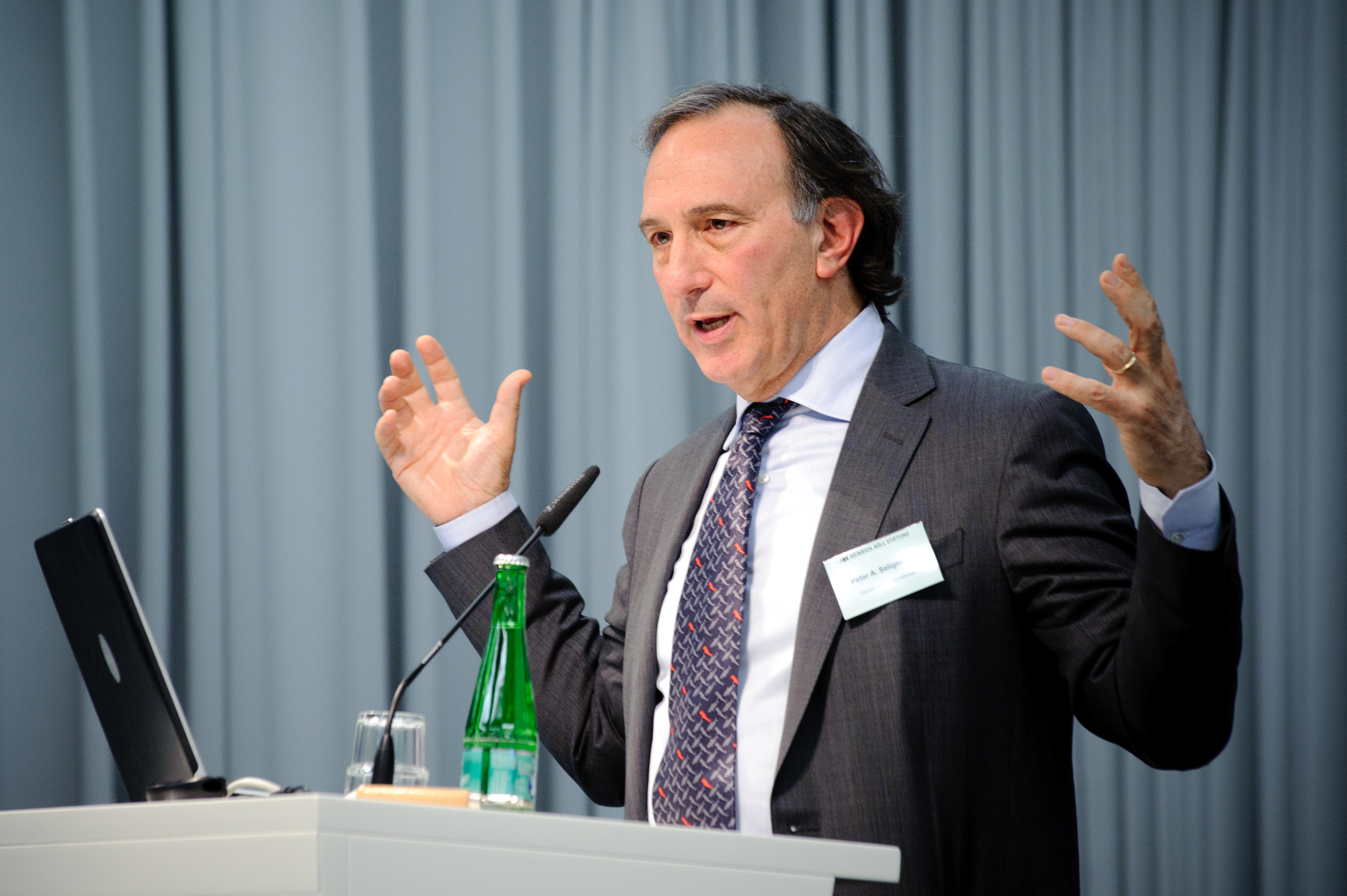
- Peter Seligman, 2010
- Born: September 30, 1950 (age 75); New York City, U.S.
- Occupation: Conservationist
- Years active: 1976–present
- Organization(s): Nia Tero, Conservation International
- Known for: Founding CEO and Board Director of Nia Tero
- Spouse: Lee Rhodes (m. 2008)
- Website: niatero.org

Peter A. Seligmann (born September 30, 1950) is an American conservationist and nonprofit founder. Seligmann is chairman of Conservation International, an Arlington, Virginia-based environmental nonprofit organization, and from 1987 to 2017 served as its founding chief executive officer. He is also the founding CEO of Nia Tero, a global collaborative whose name translates in Esperanto to "our Earth."

Seligmann is a member of the Council on Foreign Relations; the Zolberg Institute on Migration and Mobility at The New School; a director at First Eagle Holdings, formerly Arnhold and S. Bleichroeder Holdings Inc.; and the Mulago Foundation. He has served as a member of The Coca-Cola Company's International Public Policy Advisory Board.

On July 20, 2000, President Bill Clinton appointed Seligmann to the Enterprise for the Americas Board.

== Early life and education ==
Seligmann was born Sept. 30,1950, in New York City to Esther Arnhold Seligmann, a dance teacher and sister of Henry H. Arnhold, and Otto Seligmann, an accountant and treasurer of Arnhold Ceramics, who both escaped Nazi Germany before moving to the US. He grew up in Plainfield, New Jersey.

Seligmann graduated from high school at the Wardlaw Country Day School in Plainfield, New Jersey, in 1968. He holds a bachelor of science in wildlife ecology from Rutgers University (1972), a master's degree in forestry and environmental science from Yale University (1974), and honorary doctorates in science from Michigan State University in 1994 and Rutgers University in 2003.

== Personal life ==
Seligmann is married to glassybaby founder Lee Rhodes, and the two reside in Seattle, Washington. Peter has three daughters from his marriage to Susan Monaghan Seligmann: Melissa Kathryn Seligmann Gokhvat, Jennifer Seligmann, and Leah Seligmann. He also has three stepchildren from his marriage to Lee Rhodes: Mericos Hector Rhodes, Evelyn Sale Rhodes, and Cedric Saunders Rhodes.

Seligmann is an avid world traveler, fisherman, and diver

== Career ==
After graduating from Yale University, Seligmann took a job with The Nature Conservancy, stewarding the organization's preserves in 13 states in the Western United States. Later, he helmed the California Nature Conservancy and the Nature Conservancy’s International program.

In 1987, Seligmann became the co-founder and CEO of Conservation International. Seligmann has said his vision is to support an environmentally healthy world that provides economic opportunities and security, and he fulfills it by bringing together everyone from business and religious leaders to bureaucrats and scientists to local and indigenous people.

He served as CEO until July 1, 2017, when he was succeeded by the conservation scientist M. Sanjayan.

Peter co-founded Nia Tero in 2017.

Seligmann remains chairman of Conservation International alongside board members including former Walmart Chairman S. Robson Walton, chairman of the executive committee; actor Harrison Ford, vice chairman of the board; Laurene Powell Jobs, founder of Emerson Collective; President Ian Khama of Botswana; Northrop Grumman Corp. CEO Wesley G. Bush; Ann Friedman, and others.
