= Rothschild Bank =

Rothschild Bank generally refers to the banks that trace their origin to Mayer Amschel Rothschild's banking business started in the 1760s:

- M. A. Rothschild & Söhne in Frankfurt (1810-1901)
- N M Rothschild & Sons in London (1811-2011)
- Banque Rothschild in Paris (1817-1981)
- S. M. von Rothschild in Vienna (1820-1938)
- C M de Rothschild & Figli in Naples (1821-1863)
- Edmond de Rothschild Group in Geneva (est. 1953)
- Rothschild & Cie Banque in Paris (1986-2011)
- Rothschild & Co in London (est. 2011)

== See also ==
- L.F. Rothschild in New York (1899-1987), unrelated to the European Rothschild banking family
- S. Bleichröder, the Rothschilds' Berlin agent from 1828
- Banque Lambert, the Rothschilds' Belgian affiliate until the 1920s
- Creditanstalt, Austrian bank controlled by the Rothschilds from 1855 to 1931
- Hungarian General Credit Bank, the Rothschild's Hungarian affiliate founded in 1867
- Daniel Weisweiller and Ignacio Bauer, Rothschild agents in 19th-century Spain
- August Belmont, Rothschild agent in mid-19th-century United States
