= Gerson von Bleichröder =

German banker (1822–1893)

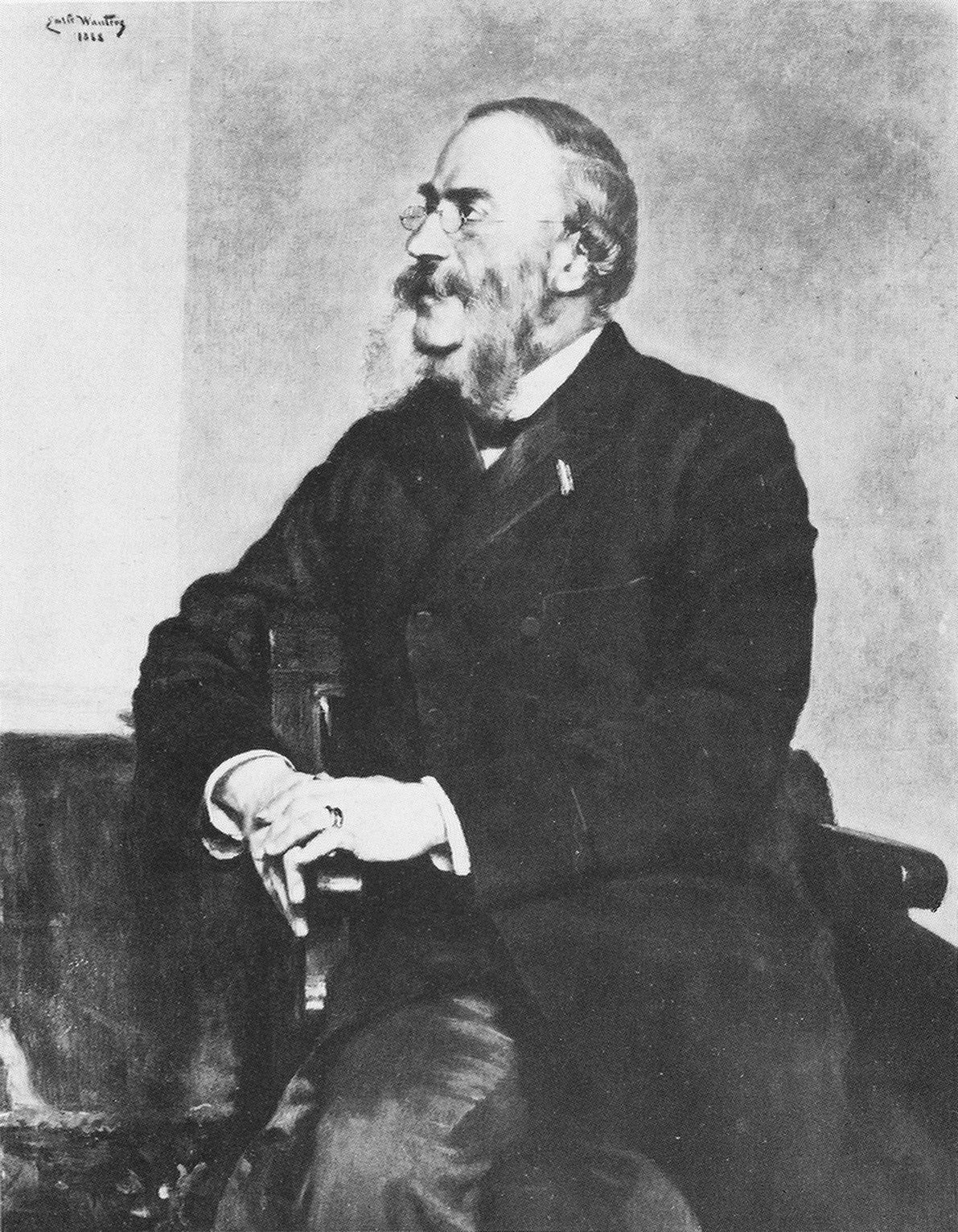
- Gerson von Bleichröder (painted by Emile Wauters, 1888)
- Born: 22 December 1822; Berlin, Prussia
- Died: 18 February 1893 (aged 70); Berlin, Germany
- Occupation: Banker
- Spouse: Emma Guttentag
- Children: Hans von Bleichröder; James von Bleichröder; Georg von Bleichröder; Elsa von Bleichröder
- Parent(s): Samuel Bleichröder and Johanna Levin Aron

Gerson von Bleichröder (22 December 1822 – 18 February 1893) was a Jewish German banker and close confidant of Otto von Bismarck. He served as Bismarck's financial agent, especially when the Prussian king required financial independence from the United Prussian Diet during the critical period of German unification. He became the second non-converted Jew in Prussia to be granted a hereditary title of nobility.

== Family background and early life ==
Gerson's family name probably originated from Bleicherode, a town in the Prussian Harz region in the historical province of Saxony, east of present-day Göttingen, Germany. We know that Gerson's grandfather, Gerson Jacob, was born in the 1740s and as a young man went to Berlin, having received the right of residency there, since the Jewish community needed a gravedigger (the position also carried with it certain religious obligations). In Berlin, he married Suze Aaron, the daughter of a protected Jew (Schutzjude), which provided additional employment opportunities and was a significant achievement for upwardly mobile Gerson Jacob.

Gerson Jacob had four sons. His eldest son, Samuel Bleichröder, opened a currency exchange office (Wechselstube) in 1803 in a remote corner of Berlin, which would later grow into the banking firm of S. Bleichröder. In those early years, Berlin was an entrepôt between East and West and there was a demand for exchange services of the many principalities of the Holy Roman Empire. Business improved when the French occupied Berlin in 1806. Samuel's shop also sold lottery tickets for such funds as army widows and disabled soldiers. By the late 1820s, Samuel had progressed to merchant-banker status and had established initial contacts with the Rothschilds, the international banking house.

Bleichröder was born in Berlin. Gerson first joined the family business in 1839. In 1855 upon the death of his father, Gerson became the head of the banking firm. The bank maintained close contacts with the Rothschild family; the banking house of Bleichröder acted as a branch office in Berlin of the Rothschilds' bank.

In the nineteenth century, the Rothschild banking house represented the interests of the Austrian-controlled German Confederation in Europe. In the conflict that developed between the rapidly expanding Kingdom of Prussia and the pro-Austrian German Confederation, the Rothschild Bank found itself largely caught in an uncomfortable middle position.

== Meeting Bismarck ==
Since 1851, Otto von Bismarck had been serving as the Prussian ambassador to the German Confederation headquartered at Frankfurt-am-Main, a free city of the Confederation in what is now western Germany. However, in March 1858, Bismarck was appointed ambassador to the Russian Empire. Before leaving Frankfurt for St. Petersburg, Russia, Bismarck consulted with Baron Mayer Carl von Rothschild for the name of a Berlin banker to handle his personal finances as well as Prussian state business. Why Bismarck would ask the Rothschild Bank to recommend a competing bank is not hard to understand. Everyone in Frankfurt knew that Prussia would have to distance itself from the Rothschild Bank given the Rothschilds' close relations with Prussia's main rival – Austria-Hungary. However, neither Bismarck nor Prussia wanted to sever relations and totally alienate the Rothschilds. What better way to avoid this fissure with the Rothschilds than to ask the Rothschilds to provide the name of an alternative bank.

The Rothschilds recommended Gerson Bleichröder, who took over Bismarck's private banking, as well as the transfer of credits or placing of loans on behalf of the Prussian state and, after 1871, the German Empire. Thus, Bleichröder became intimately involved with not only Bismarck personally but also, through Bismarck, with the inner dynamics of the subsequent unification of Germany.

== Unification of the German States ==
In the decades following Bismarck's death, it became an article of faith among German historians that the man Bismarck, through his own efforts, was most responsible for Germany's unification under the Prussian throne. This proposition, based on the "Great Man Theory" of history, has been effectively challenged by recent historians. Importantly, German economic historian Helmut Böhme argued that the Zollverein customs union of northern Germany, not Bismarck, was the most important agent in unifying Germany.

At the end of the Napoleonic era, the largely German-speaking territory in Central Europe was a vast patchwork of small principalities, duchies, and kingdoms, with the Austrian Empire, as the largest German-speaking state, assuming leadership. The Congress of Vienna in 1815 established the German Confederation, which organized nearly all the German-speaking states under the control of the dual authority of Austria and Prussia. However, Prussia was clearly the weaker power in this dual authority within the German Confederation. Economically, the Austrian Empire based itself on the landowning aristocracy. This landowning aristocracy required the Austrian state to maintain high tariffs against the cheap imports of raw farm products. This kept prices of food products within the Austrian Empire higher than in other areas of Europe. Prussia, because of its location near the Baltic Sea, was an up-and-coming power in Europe based on the new economy of trade, commerce and manufacturing. As an economy based largely on trade, the Prussian economy thrived only when barriers to trade were reduced – barriers like high protective tariffs on imports from other countries. Accordingly, Prussia united with other German states in 1818 to form a customs union – the Zollverein. The states that joined the Zollverein were other German states that profited from trade and thus favored low tariffs or even free trade. Generally, the states that joined the Zollverein were located in the northern part of the German-speaking region of Europe. The Zollverein was a Prussian-dominated economic union of German-speaking states.

Because of the rising power of the Zollverein, Frederick William IV (1795–1861), king of Prussia from the death of his father in 1840 until 1861, began to entertain visions of a new political union of German states which would grow out of the Zollverein. The Austrian-controlled German Confederation had been disbanded during the Revolution of 1848. Frederick William IV's chief minister from 25 April 1849, until November 1850, was General Joseph von Radowitz. Radowitz now sought to establish a new Prussian-dominated union to replace the old German Confederation. In October 1850, an agreement was made to have an assembly of all German states meet in the city of Erfurt, Germany to form this "Prussian Union". At the time of the Erfurt Union, Bismarck did not have any use for the proposed union of German states under Prussian leadership. Just why Bismarck of all people would refuse to support a unification in Germany under Prussian leadership in 1850 and just ten years later become the chief spokesman for just such a Prussian-led union of German states is curious, but as strong as the Zollverein was in 1850, the customs union, by 1860, had become much more influential over the economies of its members.

Between 1850 and 1860, the members of the Zollverein adopted a common currency, a common postal system and a common commercial code. Later the Zollverein signed various reciprocal treaties with nations outside the customs union, culminating in the signing of a reciprocal treaty with France in 1862. From this position of power, the Zollverein brought about the rapid industrialization of northern Germany and became a prime reason for Prussian involvement in the Second Schleswig-Holstein War of 1864. As result of that war, two predominately German-speaking duchies, Schleswig and Holstein were ceded by Denmark and annexed by Prussia and Austria. Another war, the Austro-Prussian War of 1866, and the dramatic military defeat of Austria at the Battle of Sadowa, resulted in both Schleswig and Holstein being ceded only to Prussia. Neither of these duchies had much in the way of mineral wealth or industry. Even as late as the middle of the twentieth century, both duchies remained predominately rural with only 24% of the total population living in the main cities of Kiel (Note: The population of Kiel was 218,335 in 1950.) and Lübeck. (Note: The population of Lübeck was 133,021 in 1950.) However, the duchies were to have a great impact on the industrialization of northern Germany because of their location and topography. As early as 1784, a canal had been operating across the neck of the Jutland peninsula on which Denmark is located. This canal was known as the Eider Canal because it largely followed the winding Eider river across the Jutland peninsula. The Eider Canal saved a great deal of time and money by eliminating the need of ships to sail the long and dangerous route around the Jutland peninsula to deliver cargo from the Baltic Sea to the North Sea and vice versa. However, by 1860, shipping had gone from sail to steam and the Eider Canal had been largely outdated. Accordingly, rebuilding of the Eider Canal or construction of a new canal was drastically needed. After the annexation of Schleswig by Prussia, the Prussian government set about improving the Eider Canal by building a new canal along a shorter, more direct route and by widening the canal to fit modern ships. Commercial pressure encouraged the development of the new canal which, when completed in 1887, was named the Kaiser Willhelm Canal. Indeed, the economic motivation behind the canal most probably was the main motivation for the war on Denmark in the first place.

The Schleswig-Holstein War of 1864 was the first of three wars that brought about the Germany's unification into a single state under the Prussian crown's authority. The other two were the Austro-Prussian War of 1866 and the Franco-Prussian War of 1870. In January 1871, at a ceremony in Versailles, William I of Prussia was crowned German Emperor of a now unified German Empire. Against this background German Empire building, relationship of Gerson Bleichröder and Otto von Bismarck played itself out.

== Banker for Bismarck and the Prussian State ==
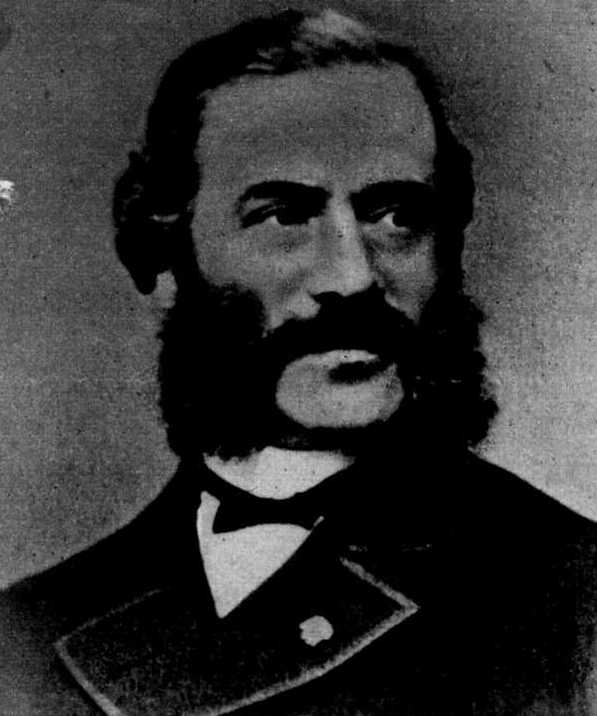
Gerson von Bleichröder

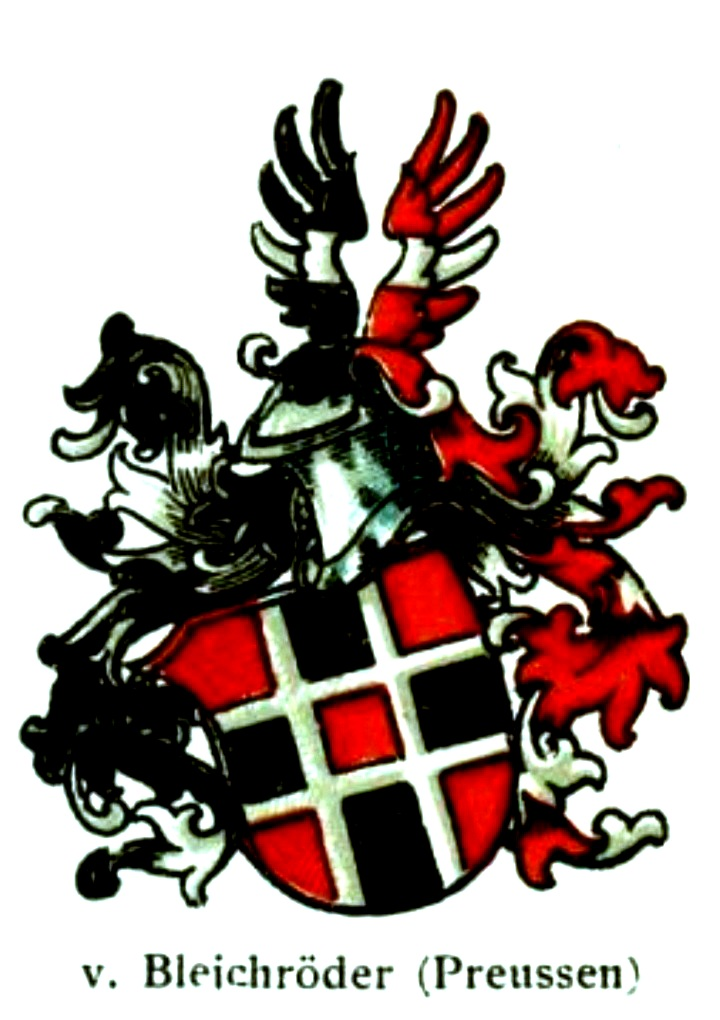
Coat of arms of the Bleichröder family in Prussia

Gerson Bleichröder served Bismarck at several crucial points during the period of time that Bismarck was the chief minister to the Prussian king. As a result of the Schleswig War of 1864, Prussia and Austria, as joint victors in that war, were awarded the two German-speaking duchies of Schleswig and Holstein on 1 August 1864. Prussia annexed the more northern duchy of Schleswig, while Austria was given annexation control over the more southern duchy of Holstein. Austria did not share any border with the newly acquired duchies, but the duchy of Holstein was located between Schleswig to the north and Prussian-controlled territories to the south. Austria sought to create difficulties for its up-and-coming rival – Prussia – by entertaining the idea of inviting the heir of the deposed House of Schleswig-Holstein-Sonderburg-Augustenburg – Duke Frederick VIII of Augustenburg – back to administer the Holstein duchy. This solution was intolerable to Prussia because the Duke of Augustenburg was related to the royal family of Denmark. The Prussians feared that Danish troops would return to same frontier that they had occupied prior to the war. Furthermore, the Prussian-annexed Schleswig duchy (where the Prussian government was intending to upgrade the Kiel Canal) would be isolated from the rest of Prussian Germany.

Accordingly, a plan was developed for Prussia to purchase all Austrian rights to the duchies before any transfer of those rights could be made to Duke Frederick. The deal had a good chance of succeeding because the Austria Empire was in financial trouble at the time. Gerson Bleichröder opened secret negotiations with Moritz Ritter von Goldschmidt to pay a large sum of money to Austria for any and all rights to the two duchies of Holstein and Schleswig. In the end, the administration of Holstein was not settled until 1866, after the Austro-Prussian War.

Meanwhile, Bismarck still needed funds to pay for the Schleswig-Holstein War. Despite the victory's glory for Prussia, the elected Prussian Diet, authorized to raise public funds, was dragging its feet on payment. As a staunch monarchist who detested elected parliaments, Bismarck particularly loathed going 'hat in hand' to the Prussian Diet to beg for money. Accordingly, Gerson Bleichröder developed several plans by which money could be raised without going to the Prussian Diet. For instance, the Prussian State Bank (Preussische Seenhandlung), which had been founded by Frederick the Great in 1772 still operated as an independent financial institution under the Prussian throne. Money could be raised by the king independently of the Prussian Diet, either by selling bank shares or by arranging a bond issue through the bank. In the summer of 1865, the Rothschild Bank, working through Gerson Bleichröder, underwrote an entire public offering of bonds against the government shares of Seehandlung.

Furthermore, much of Germany's railroad-building was publicly funded, with the government taking part ownership in exchange. Consequently, by 1860, the government had a large investment in all German railroads. One of these railroads was the Cologne-Minden Railroad where Gerson Bleichröder was conveniently the banker and a board director. This provided an opportunity: the government could sell its railroad shares or take a loan with the government shares as collateral. In the end, the Cologne-Minden Railroad government shares were sold to raise money independently of the Prussian Diet.

The spectacular victory of the Prussian Army at the battle of Sadowa (Königgrätz) on 3 July 1866 during the Austro-Prussian War changed the entire face of Europe. Many of the small German states flocked to the banner of Prussia by joining the new Prussian-led North German Confederation which was formed in April 1867. No longer merely an economic union like the Zollverein, the North German Confederation had a constitution and a democratically elected Reichstag based on universal popular sovereignty. Inside the North German Confederation, the German nation was completely integrated under Prussian rule. However, the three large south-German states of Bavaria, Württemberg and Baden remained outside of the Confederation. These German states hoped to remain independent of the confederation and had looked to Austria for protection from forced absorption into the Prussian-dominated confederation. However, since the utter defeat of the Austrians at the battle of Sadowa, the three south-German states had begun to look to an alliance of Austria and France as their only protection. Thus, war clouds rose again as Prussia began to see France as the major obstacle to unification of all Germany under the Prussian throne. It has been a matter of dispute between recent German historians as to whether Bismarck wanted war with France or not. Some historians feel that Bismarck was forced into a war he did not want. Others view Bismarck as actively pushing war with France continuously from the time of the Battle of Sadowa. The reason there are no clear historical records to resolve this conflict is that whatever Bismarck's views on war with France, he insisted on keeping his views very much private. What contacts he had with France regarding the political situation were made in a furtive way. Once again he turned to Gerson Bleichröder to handle these back-channel communications with the French government. During July 1870, Bleichröder was in frequent contact with the Rothchilds in Paris – bankers to Napoleon III and the French government – to ascertain Napoleon's true intentions with regard to war.

As the chief banker for Bismarck and the Prussian state, Gerson Bleichröder was also in a position to help several influential German families in their hour of need. In 1868, an ambitious 1,473-kilometre (915 mi) railroad project in Rumania, which would link the Rumanian capital, Bucharest, with all other major parts of the country, was touted to investors by financier Bethel Henry Strousberg. However, in 1871, while construction of the railway was underway, the consortium headed by Strussberg went into bankruptcy. In order to help a few prominent German families out of their rash and speculative investments in the Strussberg consortium, the entire Strussberg consortium was purchased out of bankruptcy by another consortium headed by Gerson Bleichröder and supported by Otto von Bismarck. As a result, Gerson Bleichröder became an accepted part of the non-Jewish and often antisemitic German society. He became a partner at the investment bank of Ladenburg Thalmann. Bleichröder and his family were made Prussian nobles on 8 March 1872, in Berlin. Bleichröder was only the second Jew in Prussia to be ennobled. Bleichröder was preceded only by Abraham Oppenheim, another banker close to the regime, ennobled four years earlier.

== Legacy ==
Gerson's children were baptized during their father's lifetime. The banker James von Bleichröder (1859–1937) became known as an art collector. Georg (1857–1902) moved to Cologne. The eldest son, Hans von Bleichröder (1853 (Note: Or 1856.)-1917), had a mausoleum decorated with sculptures by the Berlin sculptor Hans Latt built in the Friedrichsfelde central cemetery in 1913, in which a total of seven members of his family were buried – including Gerson Bleichröder's three sons. The mausoleum was destroyed in 1950 on the orders of the communist Wilhelm Pieck, then President of the GDR, because it towered over the new socialist memorial created according to his plans, which he felt detracted from the overall impression. Today, a small gravestone commemorates the banking family.

The bank was taken over by the Dresdner Bankhaus Gebrüder Arnhold in 1931, part of the business was transferred to New York six years later and the rest was transferred to Dresdner Bank and its financial institution Hardy & Co. as part of the 'aryanization' process. The New York company operated for many decades as Arnhold and S. Bleichroeder Advisers and was only renamed First Eagle Investment Management in 2009.

The German-American historian Fritz Stern wrote a double-biography of Otto von Bismarck and Gerson von Bleichröder titled Gold and Iron: Bismarck, Bleichröder, and the Building of the German Empire.

== See also ==
- Arnhold and S. Bleichroeder, an investment bank.

== Sources ==
- Barnavi, Eli, ed. (1992). "Jews in Modern Economy". A Historical Atlas of the Jewish People. London: Hutchinson. pp. 164–165. ISBN 0-09-177593-0. OCLC 27415494. OL 14903461M.
- Couch, William T., ed. (1959). "Germany". Collier's Encyclopedia. Vol. 9. New York: P. F. Collier and Son.
- "About Us - Our History and Guiding Principals | First Eagle Investments". First Eagle Investments. "Arnhold and S. Bleichroeder formed in Berlin [...] Renamed First Eagle Investment Management"
- Hitchins, Keith (1994). Rumania: 1866-1947. Oxford, England: Clarendon Press. ISBN 0-19-822126-6. LCCN 93031575. OCLC 1188973386. OL 1421389M.
- kdrewes (4 February 2014). "Bleichröder". Jüdischer Adel (in German).
- Koch, Hannsjoachim Wolfgang [in German] (1978). A History of Prussia. Longman. ISBN 0-582-48189-9. LCCN 77022437. OCLC 1149520073. OL 21270984M.
- Palmer, Alan (1976). Bismarck. New York: Charles Scribner's Sons Publishers. ISBN 0-684-14683-5. LCCN 76006021. OCLC 1345497341. OL 21270149M.
- Pollock, James Kerr; Thomas, Homer L. (1952). Germany in Power and Eclipse. Toronto, Canada: David Van Nostrand. LCCN 52010482. OCLC 3092980. OL 6113160M.
- Sperber, Jonathan. Bismarck: A Life.
- Steinberg, Jonathan (2011). Bismarck: A Life. Oxford: Oxford University Press. ISBN 978-0-19-978252-9. LCCN 2010045387. OCLC 719369985. OL 24881585M.
- Stern, Fritz (1977). Gold and Iron: Bismarck, Bleichröder and the Building of the German Empire. New York: Vintage Books. ISBN 0-394-74034-3. LCCN 79011462. OCLC 4775649. OL 4408199M.
  - Sperber, Jonathan (1977). "". In Stern (1977).
- Wininger, Salomon (1925). Große jüdische National-Biographie: mit mehr als 8000 Lebensbeschreibungen namhafter jüdischer Männer und Frauen aller Zeiten und Länder; ein Nachschlagewerk für das jüdische Volk und dessen Freunde (in German). Cernauti: Orient – via Frankfurt University Library.
- Wininger, Salomon (1979). Grosse Jüdische National-Biographie: mit nahezu 13000 Lebensbeschreibungen namhafter jüd. Männer u. Frauen aller Zeiten u. Länder; e. Nachschlagewerk für d. jüd. Volk u. dessen Freunde (in German). Nendeln: Kraus. ISBN 978-3-262-01204-2.
