= Abraham Oppenheim =

19th century German Jewish banker

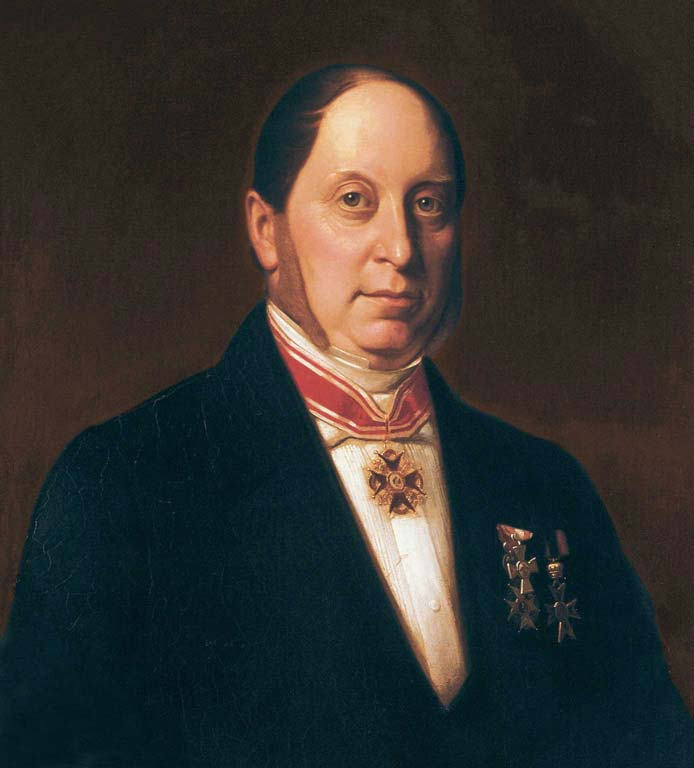
Abraham Freiherr von Oppenheim

Abraham Oppenheim (24 May 1804 in Cologne – 9 October 1878 in Cologne), titled in 1868 as Abraham Freiherr von Oppenheim, was a German banker and patron.

== Life and career ==
Oppenheim was the second son among the twelve children of banker Salomon Oppenheim, Jr. and his wife Therese Stein (1775–1842). Stein (also known as Deigen Levi) was the daughter of a businessman from Dülmen.

The eldest son of Salomon Oppenheim, Jr., Simon, joined his father's banking house in 1821. Abraham followed in the same year, and their mother Therese Oppenheim was given signatory power.

In 1826, Salomon Oppenheim gave his sons Simon and Abraham general power of attorney to continue the banking business. In 1828, Abraham was made a partner. The brothers transformed their father's commission and exchange house into a major private bank. Through Abraham's marriage in 1834 to Charlotte Beyfus, the Oppenheim family became relatives of the Rothschild family. (Note: Charlotte Beyfus (24 December 1820–24 October 1887) was the granddaughter of Meyer Amschel Rothschild. She married Abraham Oppenheim on 20 April 1838; the marriage was childless. (And thus, Abraham's title became extinct upon his death.) Charlotte was the daughter of Siegmund Leopold Beyfus (1786–1845) and his wife "Babette" Rothschild (1784–1869); Babette was the daughter of Mayer Amschel Rothschild (1744-1812) and his wife, née Gutle Schnapper (1753–1849).)

Abraham Oppenheim figured prominently in the finances of the German railway system, insurance industry, and the engineering and cotton industries. In 1868, he became the first unbaptised Jew to be ennobled in Prussia, being created a Baron and being admitted to the inner circle of Wilhelm I. Together with Gerson Bleichröder and other bankers, he advised the monarch on financing the Austro-Prussian War of 1866 through government bonds. The Prussian ruler rejected the plan of Oppenheim and Bleichröder, advocated by Bismarck, to finance the war by privatizing state-owned mines in the Saar.

== See also ==
- Oppenheim family
- Darmstädter Bank
- Banque Internationale à Luxembourg

== Bibliography ==
- Gabriele Teichmann (1999). "Abraham Oppenheim". Neue Deutsche Biographie (in German). Vol. 19. Berlin: Duncker & Humblot. pp. 561–562.
- Stern, Fritz (1979). Gold and Iron: Bismarck, Bleichröder, and the Building of the German Empire. New York: Vintage Books. ISBN 0-394-74034-3.
- Treue, Wilhelm (1962). "Abraham Oppenheim (1804–1878)". Rheinisch-Westfälische Wirtschaftsbiographien. Vol. 8. Münster: Aschendorff. pp. 1–31.
- Treue, Wilhelm (1986). "Die Kölner Bankiers Oppenheim: Simon Oppenheim (1803–1880), Abraham Oppenheim (1804–1878) und Dagobert Oppenheim (1809–1889)". Kölner Unternehmer im 19. und 20. Jahrhundert. Rheinisch-Westfälische Wirtschaftsbiographien. Vol. 13. Münster: Aschendorff. pp. 171–202. ISBN 3-402-05588-0.
