= Wininger =

Wininger is a surname. Notable people with the surname include:

- Bo Wininger (1922–1967), American golfer
- Salomon Wininger (1877–1968), Austrian writer

== See also ==
- Winninger
