= Stephen M. Kellen =

American investment banker (1914–2004)

Stephen and Ana-Marie Kellen receiving an award from Berlin Mayor Klaus Wowerit, 2002

Stephen M. Kellen (April 21, 1914 – February 11, 2004) was a German-born American investment banker and philanthropist. A longtime executive at Arnhold and S. Bleichroeder, he contributed to postwar German reconstruction and strengthened U.S.–German relations through his work in finance and philanthropy, notably supporting the American Academy in Berlin.

== Early life and education ==
Stephen Max Katzenellenbogen was born in Berlin to a family of Jewish heritage, where they had lived for five generations. Katzenellenbogen attended the Französisches Gymnasium in Berlin and then studied at a commercial institute.

== Banking Career ==
Katzenellenbogen left Germany in 1936, fleeing the Nazis and emigrating to London, where he worked for Lazard Brothers. In 1937 he moved to New York City working at Loeb, Rhoades & Company and anglicized his original surname to Kellen. In 1940 he married Anna-Maria Arnhold, daughter of the banker Hans Arnhold. She had emigrated from Germany in 1939; he had known and courted her in Wannsee. In 1940 he joined her father's firm, Arnhold and S. Bleichroeder, an international investment firm based in New York, now known as First Eagle Investment Management. He was president from 1955 to 1994, and co-chairman of the board until his death.

== Philanthropy ==
In March 1997, Kellen provided a $3 million founding grant for the establishment of the American Academy in Berlin, located in the former Arnhold family villa in Wannsee. The academy operates a fellowship program intended to promote political and cultural exchange between the United States and Germany. The grant was made following suggestions from former U.S. Ambassador Richard Holbrooke and historian Fritz Stern. Kellen and his family have continued to support the academy since its opening in 1998

Kellen was active in the American Council on Germany for four decades, serving on its board and establishing the Kellen Fellowship, which enables young German journalists to pursue study opportunities in the United States.

Through his family foundation, Kellen supported arts and cultural institutions, including guest performances by the Berlin Philharmonic at Carnegie Hall and the restoration of the Heinrich Heine monument in New York, created by Ernst Herter. Other organizations associated with his philanthropy include the Council on Foreign Relations, the Cathedral Church of St. John the Divine, the National Gallery of Art, the Pierpont Morgan Library, the Frick Collection, Lincoln Center, and the New School University.

Kellen and his wife established the Anna-Maria and Stephen Kellen Foundation in 1984. As of 2024, the foundation reported assets of $1.1 billion and focuses its grantmaking on the arts, education, health, media, and religion, with an emphasis on Protestant institutions.

== Honors ==
In 1991, Kellen received the Grand Cross of Merit of the Federal Republic of Germany. In 1997, he and his wife received the New York “Spirit of the City” award for their charitable work. On May 6, 2002, he was awarded the Ernst Reuter Plaque for contributions to the city of Berlin, and in 2004 he was named a Chevalier of the French Legion of Honour. In 2004 Kellen was awarded the Order of the Chevalier de la Legion d'Honneur.

== Personal ==
Kellen was married for 64 years until his death, to Anna-Marie. They had a two children, Marina Kellen French, and Michael M., Kellen After Kellen's death his son has been president of the charitable foundation. His daughter, Marina, serves as vice-president and is an active philanthropist in New York City, contributing to the Metropolitan Museum of Art, Morgan Libraryy, and the Metropolitan Opera.
