= The Extreme Right in Europe and the USA =

1992 book edited by Paul Hainsworth

- Editor: Paul Hainsworth
- Language: English
- Subject: Far-right politics
- Published: 1992 (St. Martin's Press)
- Publication place: United States
- Media type: Print (hardcover and paperback)
- Pages: 320 (first edition); 256 (second edition)
- ISBN: 0-312-08091-3

The Extreme Right in Europe and the USA (1992; second edition 1994) is a book edited by Paul Hainsworth. It is a political science study of far-right politics in Western Europe with a chapter on the United States, and one on Eastern European developments and collects work by twelve authors. Fritz Stern, writing for Foreign Affairs, described it as "uneven". A follow-up, The Extreme Right in Europe and the United States: From the Margins to the Mainstream, was published in 2000.
