= Henry H. Arnhold =

American banker and philanthropist

- Born: Heinrich-Hartmut Richard Gustav Arnhold; September 15, 1921; Dresden, Saxony (now Germany)
- Died: August 23, 2018 (aged 96); New York City, US
- Occupation: Banker

Heinrich-Hartmut Richard Gustav "Henry" Arnhold (September 15, 1921 – August 23, 2018) was an American banker and philanthropist. He was born in Dresden, the fourth child of Lisa and Heinrich Arnhold. The Arnhold family owned Arnhold Brothers, one of Germany's largest private banks, founded in 1864. In 1931 the bank joined with S. Bleichröder to form Arnhold and S. Bleichroeder.

Arnhold escaped German-occupied Norway for the United States in 1941. There, during World War II, he served in that country's army intelligence as one of the Ritchie Boys. After the war he joined the family's now New York-based Arnhold and S. Bleichroeder; where he served as chairman since 1960. In 1967 he seeded First Eagle Fund NV fund ran by George Soros.

== Philanthropy ==
Arnhold endowed The New School's library (called the Arnhold Forum) and the university's Arnhold Hall. Arnhold helped save the Mannes School of Music in 2012 from closure by The New School when he opposed the then New School president David Van Zandt, who sought to close or sell Mannes. He and his wife donated some of their collection of Meissen porcelain to the Frick Collection. After his brother Rainer died he took over the leadership of the Mulago Foundation, started by Rainer. Arnhold also made significant contributions to the city of Dresden. He was also a donor to the New York Public Library and the American Museum of Natural History.

== Family ==
In 1947, Arnhold married Clarisse Engel de Janosi. In addition to their son John, they had a daughter Michele (called Shelly) who died in 2007. In addition to his brother Ranier, he had three sisters, Esther, Ruth and Sigrid; Esther's son is the conservationist Peter Seligmann.
