= Georg Arnhold =

German banker (1849–1926)

Georg Arnhold

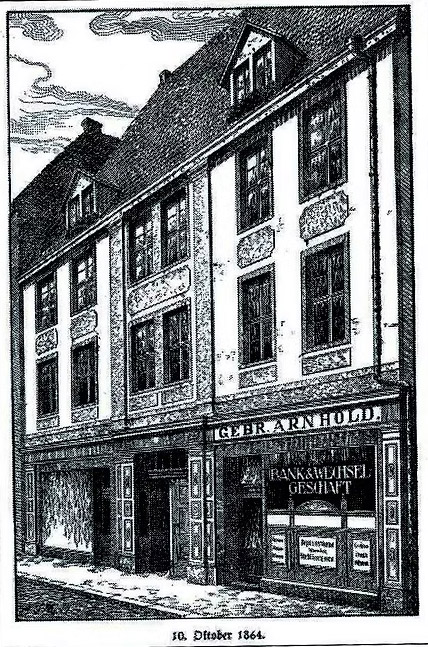
Arnhold Brothers headquarters in Dresden

Georg Arnhold (March 1, 1859–November 25, 1925) was a German banker, pacifist and philanthropist, best known for his role as senior partner at Bankhaus Gebrüder Arnhold (Arnhold Brothers) in Dresden.

== Early life ==
Georg Arnhold was born to a Jewish family in Dessau, Saxony, in 1859. His father, Adolph, was a physician and his mother, Mathilde Arnhold (née Cohn), was a bankierstochter (banker's daughter). His brother, Max, had co-founded a private bank in 1864. In 1875 Arnold left school and joined the bank as an apprentice, becoming co-owner alongside his brother in 1881.

== Banking ==
The firm started as a boutique investment bank, funding industries that were overlooked by larger banks. It became one of the largest stakeholders of brewery and porcelain companies in the Dresden region. Arnhold became president of the Dresden stock market, and in 1907 opened a Berlin branch. After World War 1, it was among the first German banks to heavily invest in the U.S. capital markets. By 1920 it was one of the five largest banks in Germany; all were Jewish owned. The bank internationally expanded, with offices in Vienna, New York City, Zurich and Amsterdam, and became heavily in volved with municipal and government bonds.

== Pacifism ==
Around 1900 Arnhold became a dedicated pacifist. He was involved in the founding of German Peace Society and established a local group. He attended multiple European pacifist congresses and for several years funded the academic international peace journal Die Friedenswarte. He participated in the establishment of the pacifist organization Band Neues Vatertland in November 1914, along with Albert Einstein and Lilli Jannasch, among others. He was a strong supporter of Esperanto, as part of his pacifist ideals. By 1920, "in keeping with older socially conservative pacifism," he became convinced that the German pacifist movement had become too radical.

== Philanthropy ==
With his brother Max, he supported non-profit organizations without regard to religion or political opinion, with an emphasis on youth development and the arts. His family has been called an "important patron" of Dresden and Technische Universität Dresden; The university bestowed the title of Honorary Senator to him. In 1924 he donated 300,000 Reichsmarks for a bathing establishment in the city..

== Legacy ==
The Georg Arnhold Program at George Eckert institute was founded by his grandson, Henry A. Arnhold, to honor his grandfather. The Georg Arnold Baths in Dresden, a sporting and bathing venue, was founded by Arnhold in 1924 and remains named after him. The bank's direct descendant, First Eagle Investments, is a global investment firm with $176 billion under management.

== Personal ==
He was married to Anna (née Burger) from 1882 until her death in 1917. Preserved letters to her during Arnhold's absences are noted to have shown a closeness to the couple. Arnhold received many awards; awards recognizing his efforts during World War 1 include the Red Cross Medal third class, the 1917 Verdientskreuz für Kriegshilfe (Cross of Service for Wartime Aid), the Prussian Iron Cross second class in 1917 and the Kriegsverdienstkreuz in 1918. After his death, his four sons, Adolf, Heinrich, Hans and Kurt, took over running the bank. Adolf Arnhold became head of the Dresden stock exchange after Arnhold's death. Heinrich was a member of the Commercial Court, and sat on the Dresden committee of the Reichsbank; Heinrich died "at the hands of the National Socialists," in 1935. Hans Arnhold was a consul general of Saxony in Prussia.

His grandson was Henry Arnhold and one of his brothers was Eduard Arnhold.
