= Eduard Arnhold =

German entrepreneur, patron of the arts and philanthropist

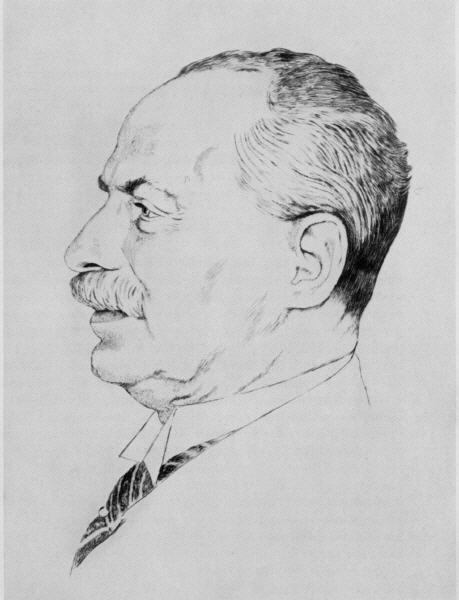
Portrait of Arnhold by Emil Orlik

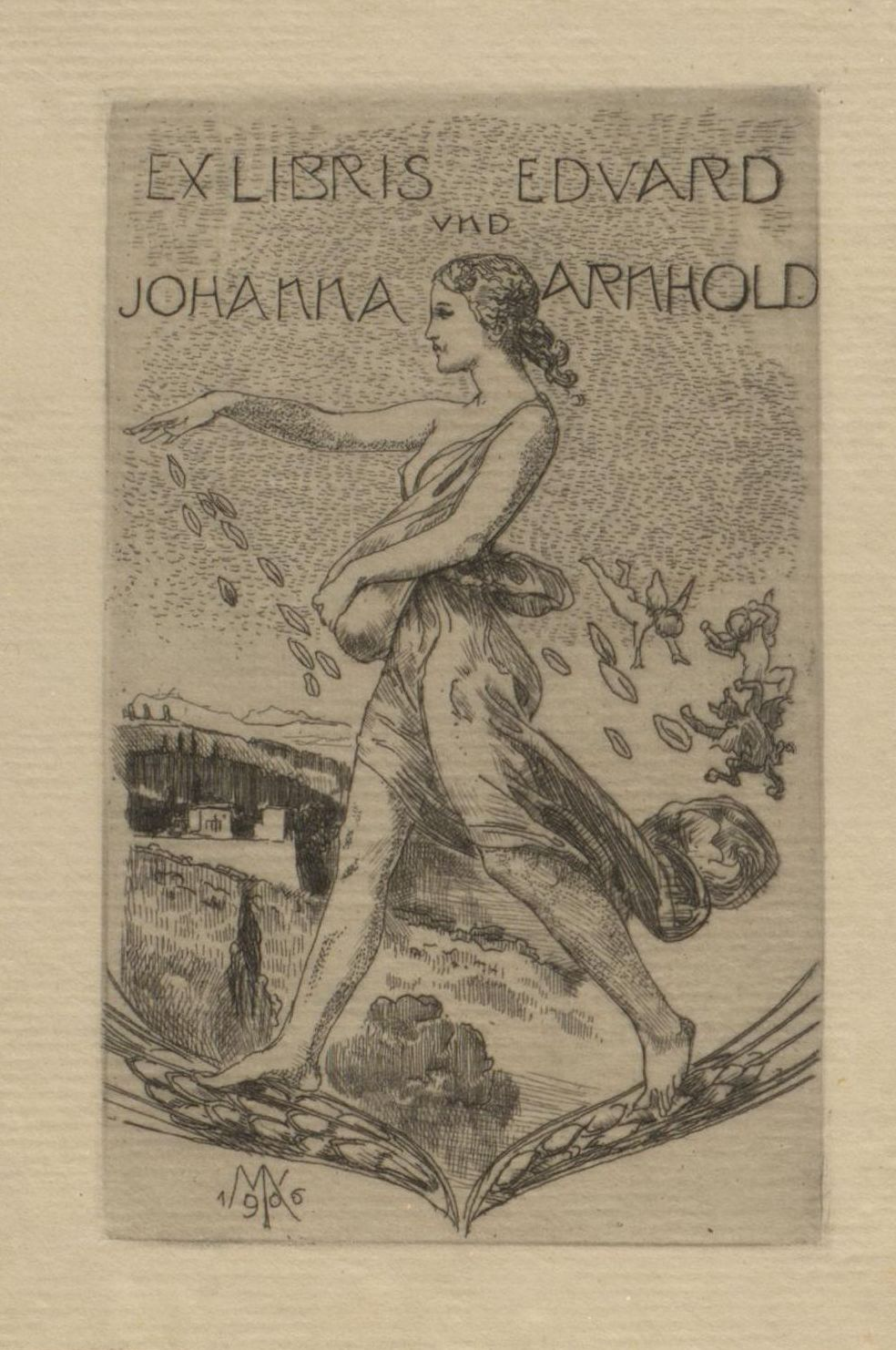
Ex-libris of the married couple Johanna and Eduard Arnhold

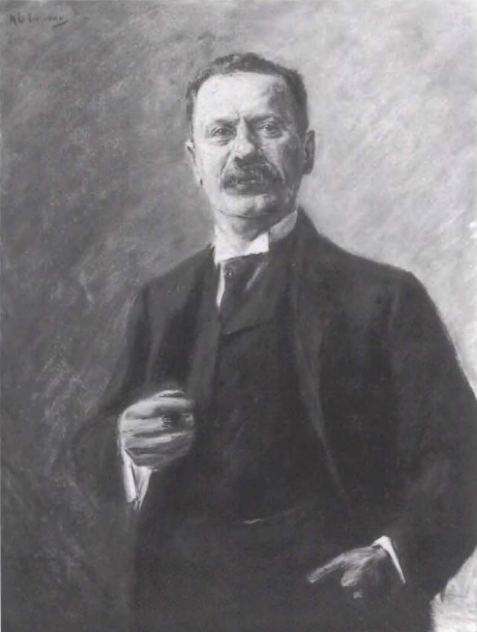
Max Liebermann: Bildnis Eduard Arnhold

Eduard Arnhold (10 June 1849 – 10 August 1925) was a German entrepreneur, coal magnate, patron of the arts and philanthropist from the famous Arnhold family.

== Life ==
Born in Dessau, Arnhold was the son of the Jewish doctor Adolph Arnhold (1808-1872) and his wife Mathilde Arnhold née Cohn (1826-1905). The bankers Georg and Max Arnhold were his brothers. Henry H. Arnhold was his great grand-nephew.

== Coal magnate ==
Arnhold became one of the wealthiest entrepreneurs under the Kaiser and the Weimar republic in the Silesian bituminous coal industry He was member of the supervisory board of the Dresdner Bank. In 1913, Wilhelm II, German Emperor appointed him as the first and only Jew to the Preußisches Herrenhaus. That he, as a non-converted Jew was "offered" a title of nobility, which he rejected, is a legend that originated in the 1920s, is not substantiated and is now regarded as improbable by researchers.

== Art Collector ==
Arnhold collected art and was friends with artists such as Max Liebermann, Arnold Böcklin, Adolph Menzel and Louis Tuaillon. In 1902, Arnhold acquired Max Liebermann's "Parrot Alley" . In 1903 he acquired Edouard Manet's In the Garden of a Villa at Bellevue (now in the Bührle collection). He was a major patron of the arts in Berlin. In 1913 hedonated the Villa Massimo in Rome as a cultural institute to the Kingdom of Prussia. The Villa Massimo is now run by the Federal Republic of Germany, and selected artists still receive scholarships and accommodation there. The "Stiftung Eduard Arnhold Hilfsfonds" in the care of the Academy of Arts, Berlin also still grants scholarships for visual artists today.

In addition to his villa on Wannsee and a city flat, he acquired the Hirschfelde manor near Werneuchen at the turn of the century. He redesigned the park there into a sculpture park and brought together works of art by numerous contemporary artists, but also found objects from distant countries. In the park, for example, he had a marble fountain built that had been excavated in Herculaneum on Mount Vesuvius.

A Van Gogh painting, Path in the Public Garden, owned by the Arnholds went missing during the Second World War, and their great-grandson, Christoph Kunheim, is searching for further information.

== Social Philanthropist ==
In addition to art, Arnhold was also socially committed. In 1907, he donated the Youth Education Centre Kurt Löwenstein in Werftpfuhl, neighbouring Hirschfelde, named after his wife. In this orphanage for girls, the protégés received an education both in the arts and with a perspective for the labour market.

From 1880, Arnhold was a member of the Society of Friends. Between 1911 and 1925, he was a member of the Senate of the Kaiser Wilhelm Society.

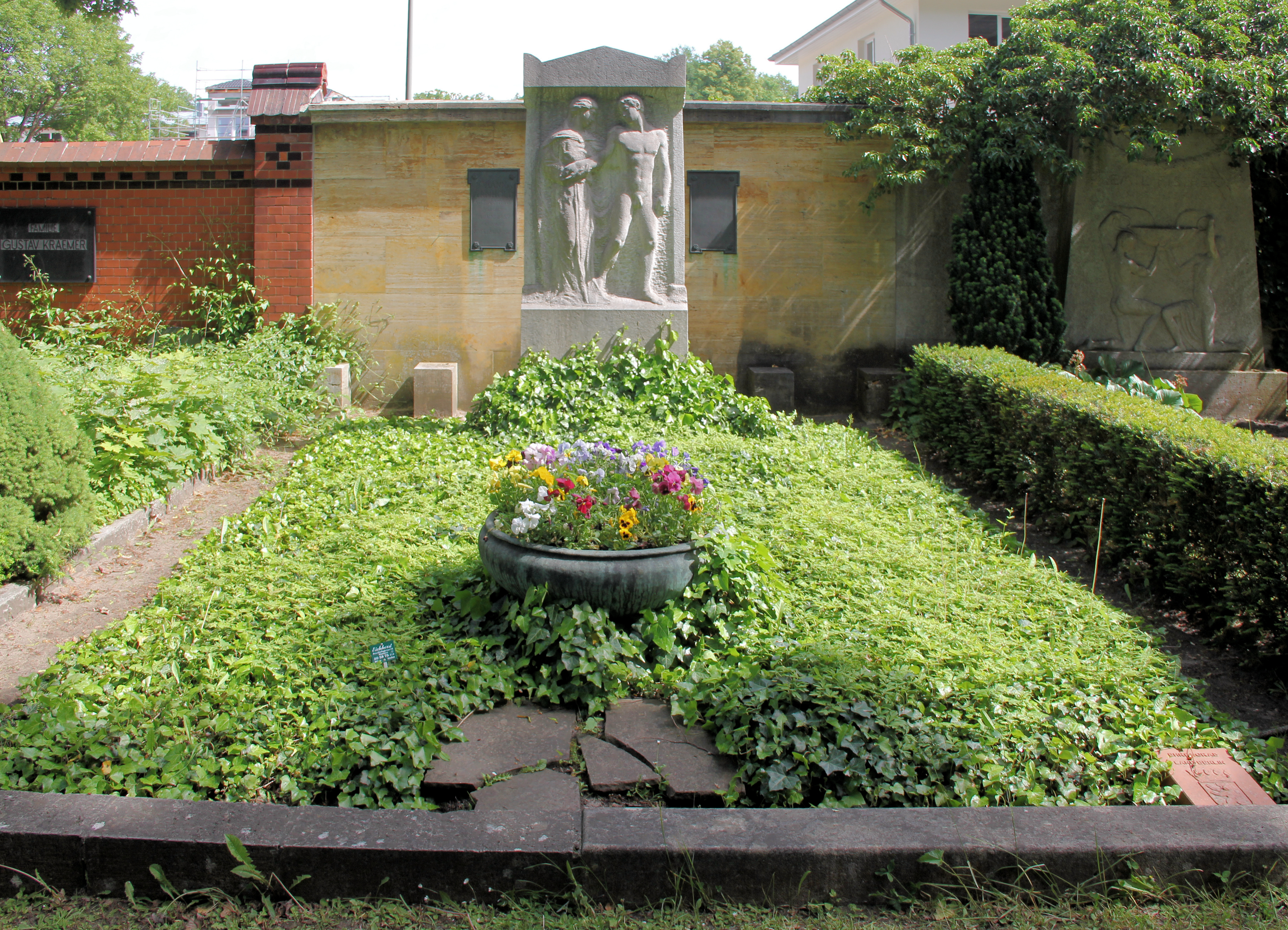
Honorary grave of Eduard Arnhold in Wannsee

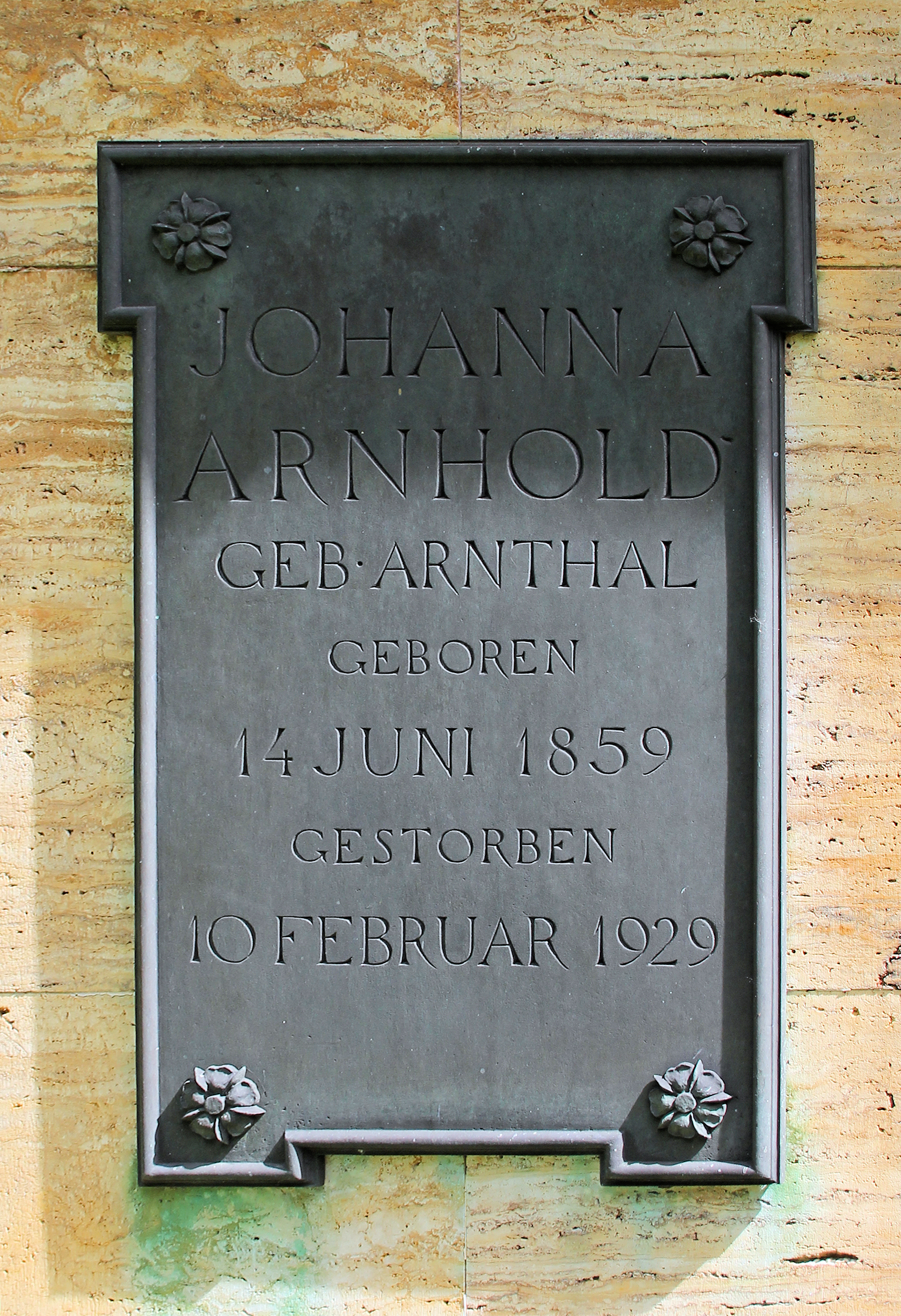
Engraving to Johanna Arnhold

Arnhold died in 1925 at the age of 76 in Neuhaus am Schliersee. His grave is located at the Friedhof Wannsee, Lindenstraße in Wannsee. He rests there at the side of his wife Johanna Arnhold née Arnthal (1859-1929). In front of the grave wall with inscription plaques is a sculpture by Theodor Georgii depicting a farewell scene. By decision of the Senate of Berlin, the final resting place of Eduard Arnhold (grave location Li AT FW-38) has been dedicated as an honorary grave of the State of Berlin since 1992. The dedication was extended in 2018 for the usual period of twenty years.

Arnhold and his wife had a daughter Elisabeth (1883-1952).
