= Heinrich Arnhold =

German banker and Esperantist (1885–1935)

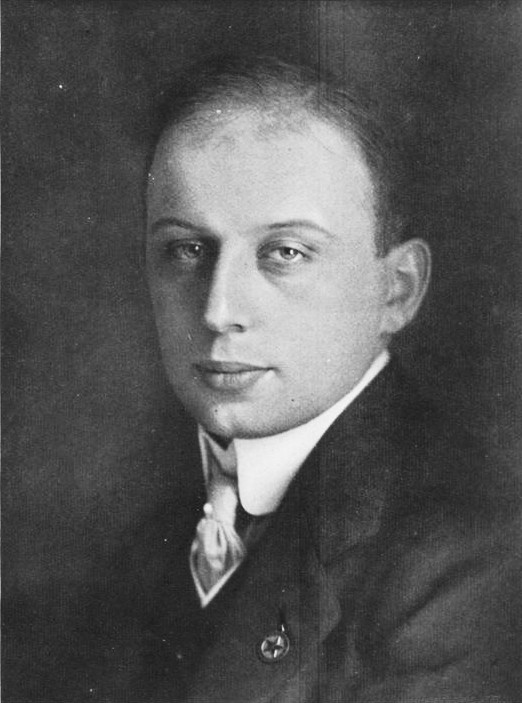
- Heinrich Arnhold (1908)
- Born: July 22, 1885; Dresden, German Empire
- Died: October 10, 1935 (aged 50); Dresden, Nazi Germany
- Occupations: Banker, Collector, Patron, Esperantist
- Known for: Art collection, Patronage, Esperanto advocacy
- Spouse: Lisa Mattersdorff (m. 1914)
- Children: Ruth, Sigrid, Rainer, Esther, Heinrich-Hartmut (Henry H. Arnhold)

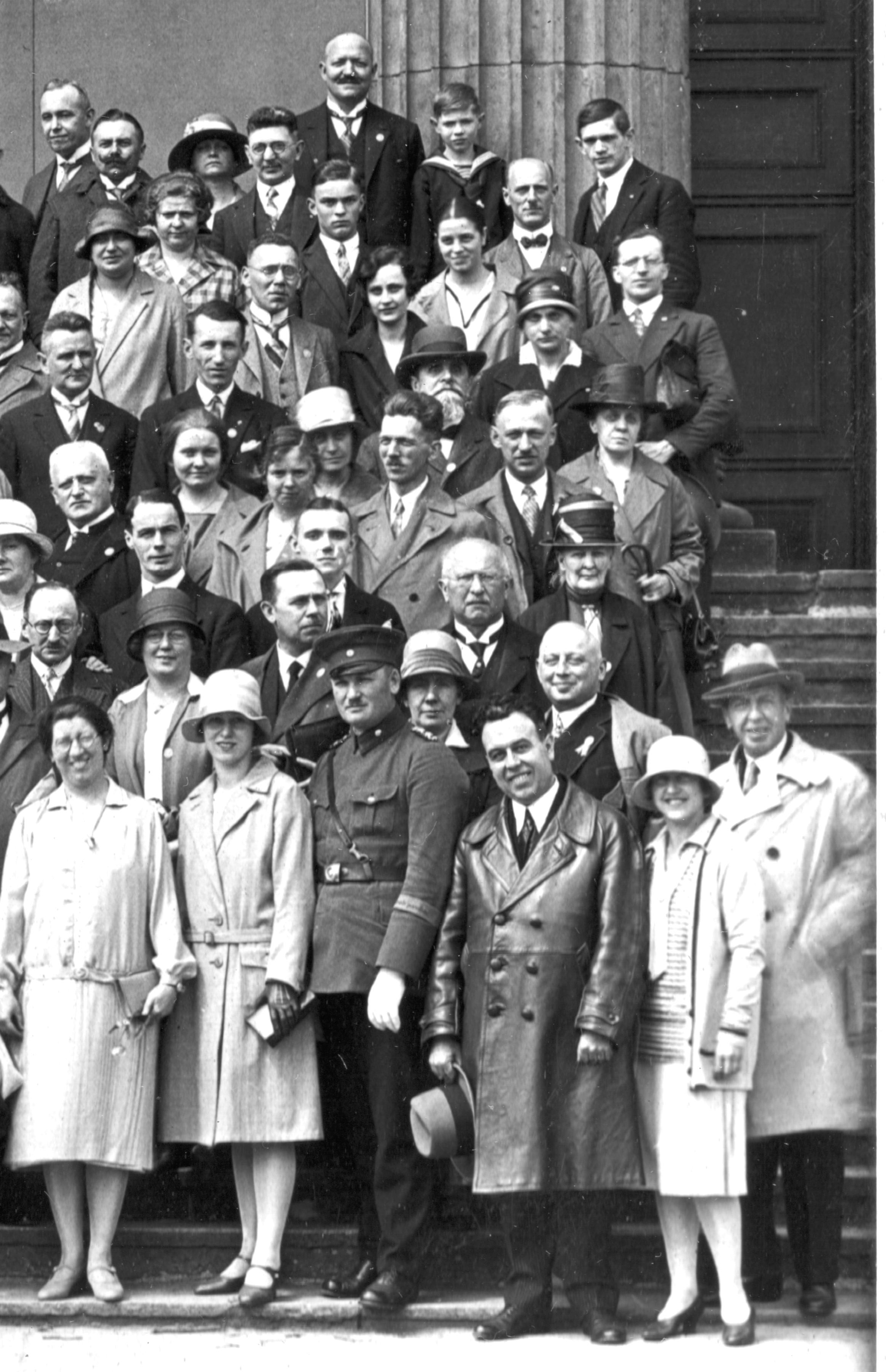
Group photo from the German Esperanto Congress in Potsdam, Whitsun 1928; Heinrich Arnhold 2nd row from bottom, 2nd from right.

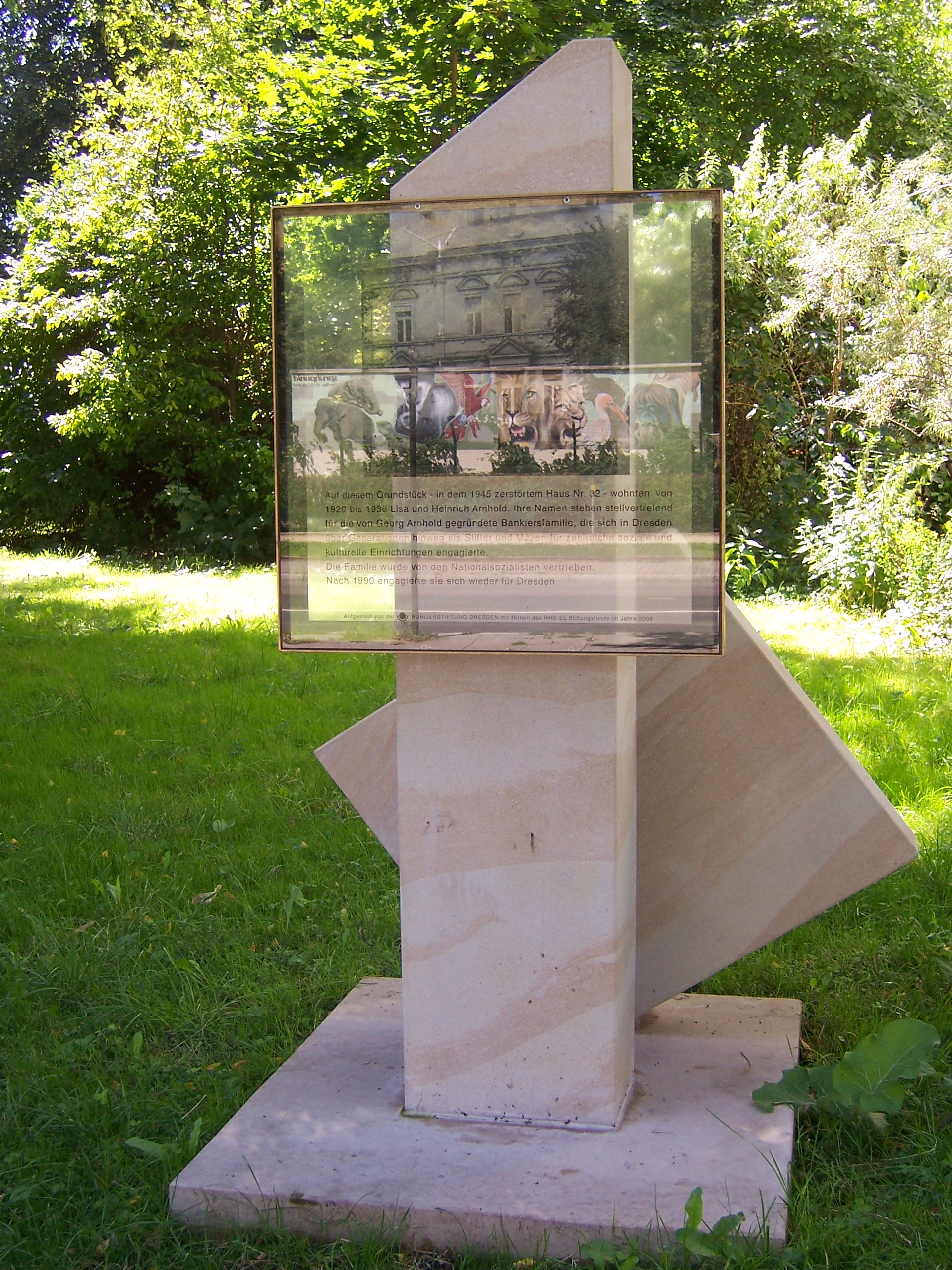
Memorial stele at the site of Arnhold's former house, created by Erika Lust.

Heinrich Arnhold, in full Heinrich Gustav Arnhold (born July 22, 1885, in Dresden; died October 10, 1935, in Dresden) was a German banker, collector, patron and esperantist.

== Life and work ==
Arnhold came from the Dresden banking family; Georg Arnhold was his father, Max Arnhold his uncle. Both had built up Arnhold Brothers into the largest private bank in Saxony.

His upbringing was shaped by the upper-middle-class and progressive atmosphere of his parental home. In 1907 he attended the 16th World Peace Congress in Munich with his father, a patron of the German Peace Society. Inspired by Bertha Suttner, he learned Esperanto at an early age. His teacher was the Dresden Esperanto poet Marie Hankel. In 1908 he was one of the organizers of the 4th Esperanto World Congress in Dresden. From 1911 to 1914 he was 1st chairman of the Saxon Esperanto Federation, from 1912 also treasurer of the German Esperanto Federation.

Heinrich Arnhold studied law and received his doctorate in law from the University of Leipzig in 1908. He joined the bank as a partner in 1910.

In 1914 he married Lisa, née Mattersdorff (1890-1972), also from a Dresden banking family. The couple had five children: Ruth, later married Steiner (1914-2001), Sigrid, later married Edwards († before 1992), Rainer († 1993), Esther, later married Seligmann (1918 - May 5, 2000), and Heinrich-Hartmut (Henry H. Arnhold). The family home on Tiergartenstraße was a social gathering place and the site of Arnhold's discussion evenings. In 1927, Arnhold had the garden of the house redesigned by Erwin Barth. Heinrich and Lisa Arnhold built up a significant collection of modern art as well as, with encouragement from the family's investments in the porcelain and ceramics industry, an extensive collection of Meissen porcelain.

Arnhold was a co-founder of the Society of Sponsors and Friends of the Dresden University of Technology (Gesellschaft der Förderer und Freunde der Technischen Hochschule Dresden, GFF) and was named its honorary senator for his long-standing commitment to the university.

== Nazi era ==
When the Nazis rose to power in 1933, Arnhold, his family and his business were persecuted because of his Jewish heritage.

At first he tried to defend himself against the beginning persecution of the Jews legally and through petitions. Arnhold suffered strokes in 1934 and 1935, as a result of which he died. His death was later recognized as related to Nazi anti-Jewish persecution. His wife Lisa, with the help of her brother-in-law Kurt Arnhold, managed to save the family and the porcelain collection, first to Switzerland and then via Portugal and Brazil to the USA.

According to Artdaily, Arnhold acquired Emil Nolde's "Buchsbaumgarten" in the sale of the Ismar Littmann collection at the Berlin auction house Max Perl in February 1935. In 2000, the Lehmbruck Museum rejected a claim from the Littmann family, saying in the sale had taken place before the Nuremberg Laws were declared and the buyer (Arnhold) had been Jewish. In 2021, however, the museum reversed its earlier decision, acknowledging that Ismar Littmann, his widow and his four children were racially persecuted by National Socialist Germany after March 30, 1933 due to their Jewish descent and therefore had to sell their art collection.

== Legacy ==
Arnhold's son, Henry H. Arnhold, escaped German-occupied Norway for the United States in 1941. There, during World War II, he served in that country's army intelligence as one of the Ritchie Boys. After the war he joined the family's now New York-based Arnhold and S. Bleichroeder; he became its non executive chairman in the 1970s.

Since 2001, the son Henry Arnhold has facilitated a lecture and discussion series jointly organized with the American Academy in Berlin by Dresden Heritage e.V. called the Lisa and Heinrich Arnhold Lecture. The events take place twice a year.

== Writings ==
- Das Stimmrecht lombardierter Aktien. Leipzig, Univ., Diss., 1908

== Literature ==
- Heike Biedermann: Die Sammlung Lisa und Heinrich Arnhold. In: Von Monet bis Mondrian. 2006, S. 101–111
- Maureen Cassidy-Geiger (Hrsg.): The Arnhold collection of Meissen porcelain 1710-50. [Exhibition The Arnhold Collection of Meissen Porcelain, 1710–50, March 25 - June 29, 2008]. New York: Frick Collection 2008, ISBN 978-1-904832-44-7, ISBN 978-0-912114-39-2
- Simone Lässig: Nationalsozialistische "Judenpolitik" und jüdische Selbstbehauptung vor dem Novemberpogrom. Das Beispiel der Bankiersfamilie Arnhold. In: Reiner Pommerin (Hrsg.): Dresden unterm Hakenkreuz. (Dresdner historische Studien 3) Weimar/Köln/Wien etc.: Böhlau 1998, ISBN 9783412111977, S. 129–192.
