= Samuel Bleichröder =

German Jewish financier (1779–1855)

- Born: 15 July 1779; Wriezen, Brandenburg
- Died: 30 December 1855 (aged 76)

Samuel Bleichröder (15 July 1779 – 30 December 1855) was a German Jewish banker and financier. Located in Berlin, Bleichröder dealt with the Prussian court. He was also involved with the Rothschilds of Frankfurt.

In 1803, he established the banking firm S. Bleichröder, which would eventually merge in 1931 to form Arnhold and S. Bleichroeder.

His family originated from Bleicherode in Thuringia, hence the surname. Both his sons Gerson von Bleichröder and Julius Bleichröder became bankers.
