= Weisweiller =

Weisweiller is a surname. Notable people with the surname include:

- Daniel Weisweiller (1814–1892), German-born Spanish banker
- Francine Weisweiller, born Francine Worms (1916–2003), French socialite and patron
