= Carl Fürstenberg =

German banker (1850–1933)

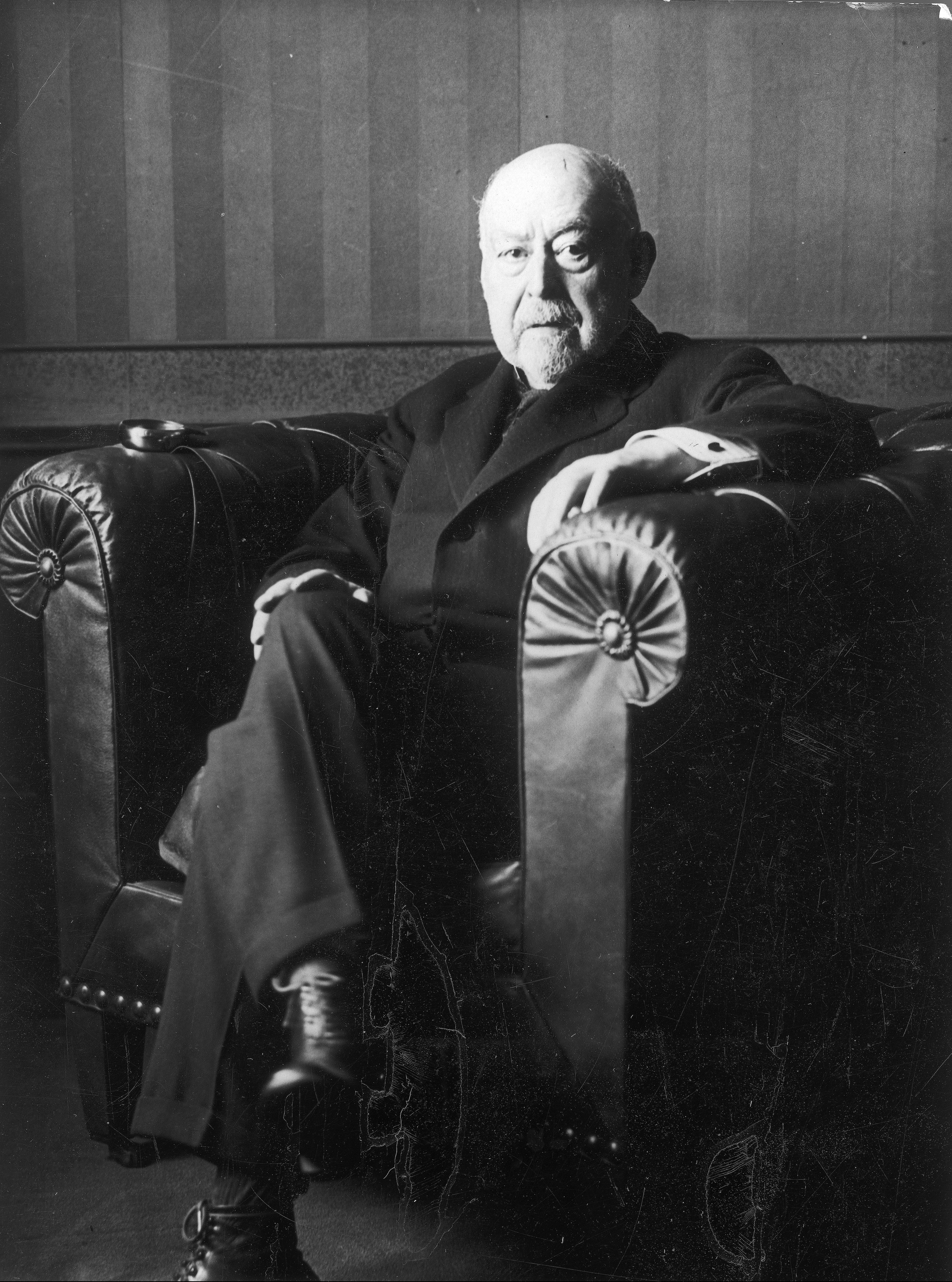
Carl Fürstenberg

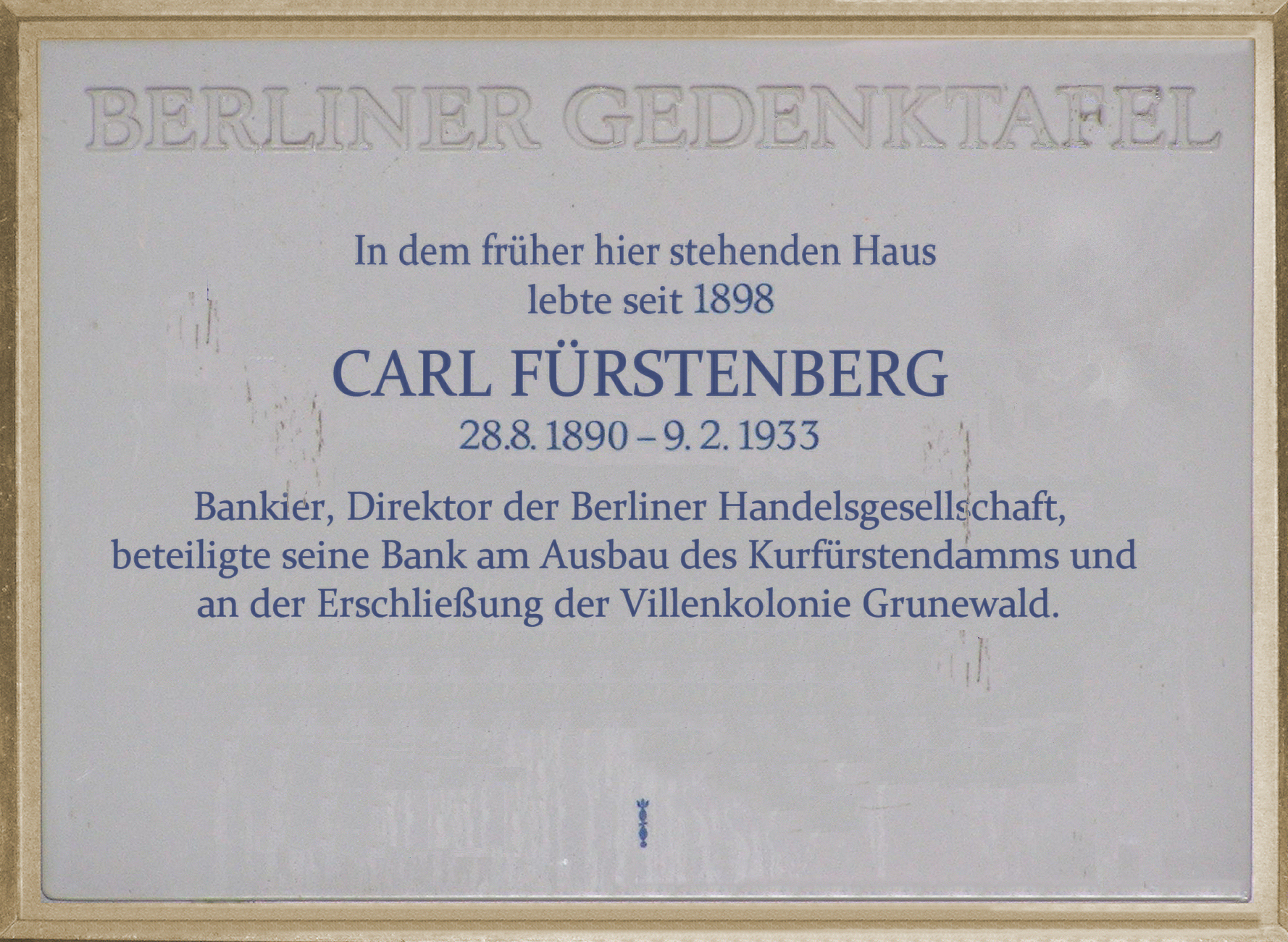
Tombstone of Fürstenberg

Carl Fürstenberg (28 August 1850 – 9 February 1933) was one of the most prominent German bankers of the late nineteenth and early twentieth century, and was responsible for the revival of the German mining industry during his era.

== Biography ==
Fürstenberg was born on 28 August 1850 to Jewish parents in Danzig (Gdańsk). While working at a West Prussian textile mill throughout his childhood, he apprenticed under local banker R. Damme. At the age of seventeen, he moved to Berlin.

At first, Fürstenberg worked for the textile company of Gebr. Simon (Simon Bros.). Two years later, he became an employee at the Disconto-Gesellschaft, one of the leading German joint-stock banks. In 1871, he defected to aristocrat Gerson von Bleichröder's well-known S. Bleichröder Bank, working in the firm as a départemental manager. In 1883, he became first director of the joint-stock bank Berliner Handels-Gesellschaft (B. G.-H.) and dominated it during the next decades in a way, that the bank was often regarded as Fürstenberg's bank. In 1884 he was accepted into the Gesellschaft der Freunde society. Under Fürstenberg, the B. G.-H. became the house bank of Emil Rathenau's AEG. In 1902, Fürstenberg made Emil Rathenau's son, Walther Rathenau a co-director of the B. G.-H. which he remained until 1907.

Fürstenberg was involved in the development of the diamond industry in German South West Africa. He also organized the construction of a railway line between Lüderitz Bay and Kubub.

In 1901, Fürstenberg received the Cross of Commander with Star of the Order of Franz Joseph.

Fürstenberg died in Berlin on 9 February 1933.

== Quotations ==
Carl Fürstenberg, who said: “The first thing you learn in banking is to respect the zeros”, wrote the famous bon mots about small shareholders: “Shareholders are stupid and cheeky. Stupid because they buy shares and cheeky because they still want dividends” and ”Net profit is the part of the balance sheet that the Management Board can no longer hide from shareholders with the best will in the world.”

The insight “If the state goes bankrupt, it is of course not the state that goes bankrupt, but the citizens” is also attributed to Fürstenberg.
