= Palace of Bauer =

Bauer Palace
- Palacio Bauer (Spanish)
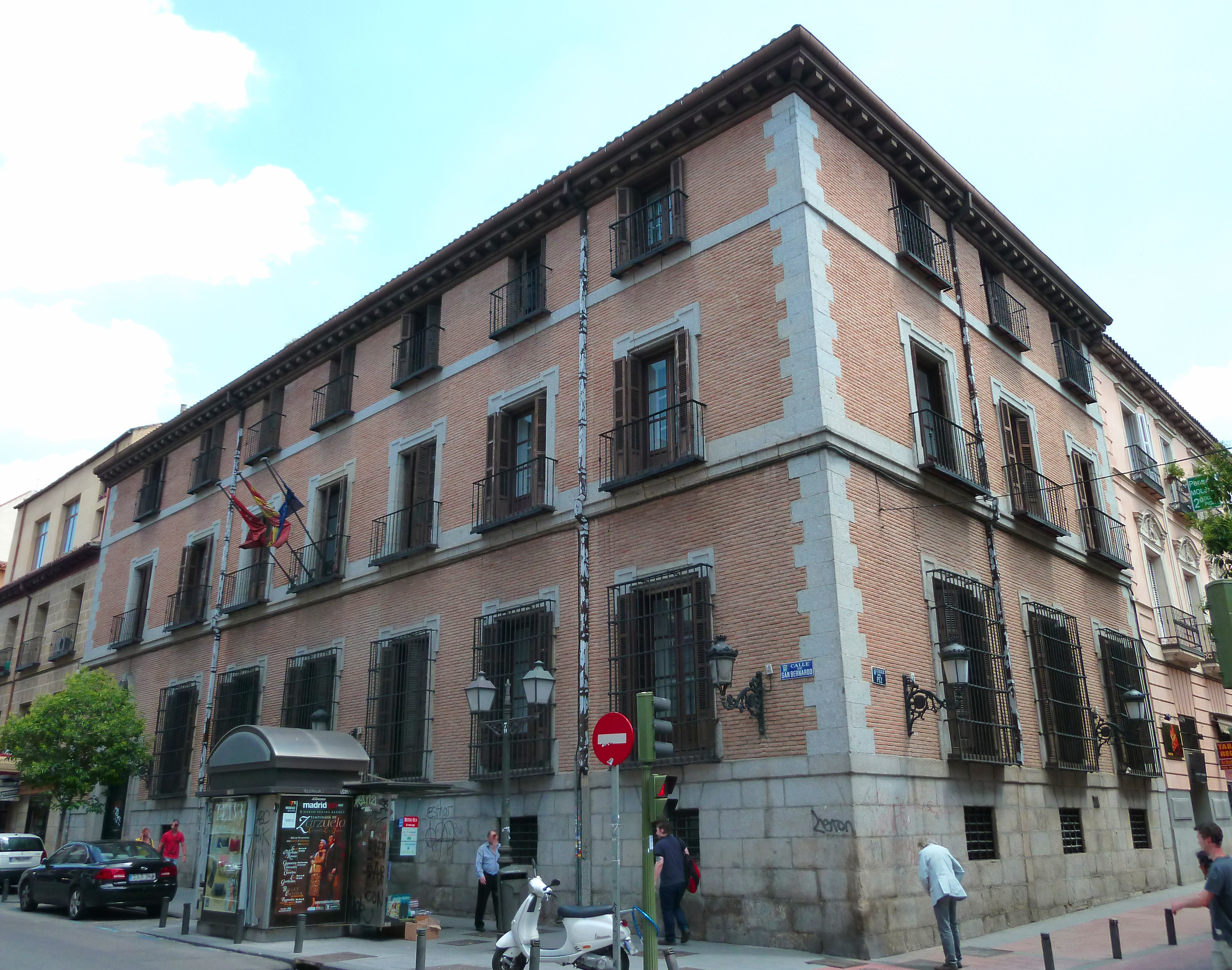

- Location within Spain
- 40.42452°N 3.70728°W
- Location: Madrid, Spain

Spanish Cultural Heritage
- Official name: Palacio Bauer
- Type: Non-movable
- Criteria: Monument
- Designated: 1972
- Reference no.: RI-51-0003869

The Bauer Palace (Spanish: Palacio Bauer) is a house-palace located in Madrid, Spain. Building was made in the 18th century and purchased by Ignacio Bauer in the 19th century. It was declared Bien de Interés Cultural in 1972.
