= Arnhold and S. Bleichroeder =

American financial services firm

Arnhold and S. Bleichroeder was a New York-based investment bank, originally formed in Germany by the 1931 merger of Arnhold Brothers and S. Bleichröder, and relocated to the United States in 1937. It remained as a fund management company under the control of the Arnhold and Kellen families until December 2015, when majority ownership was sold to the Blackstone Group LP and Corsair Capital LLC, led by Simpson Thacher & Bartlett.

== History ==
The firm's core constituent was of a merger between the banking firm of S. Bleichröder, founded by Samuel Bleichröder in 1803 in Berlin, and the banking firm of Gebr. Arnhold (Arnhold Brothers) founded in Dresden in 1864. Arnhold Brothers acquired S. Bleichroeder in 1931.

With the rise of Nazi persecution, the firm moved its activities to New York City in 1937 and conducted its business under the name of S. Bleichroeder New York Inc., Inc. Following Hans Arnhold's emigration from Paris to New York in September 1939, the firm's name was changed to Arnhold and S. Bleichroeder.

In 1967, it launched first offshore fund under the First Eagle name.

In 1987 it launched first U.S. registered mutual fund, the First Eagle Fund of America, with Harold Levy and Michael Kellen as co-portfolio managers.

In 2002, Natexis Banques Populaires, the investment banking arm of Banque Populaire, a French mutual bank, purchased the brokerage business of Arnhold and S. Bleichroeder for $105 million. The broker's existing shareholders received a 2.6% stake in Natexis, and the company was renamed Natexis Bleichroeder. The asset management business, Arnhold and S. Bleichroeder Advisors, was not part of the deal and continued to be operated through its parent, A&SB under the leadership of John Arnhold. Subsequently, Arnhold and S. Bleichroeder Advisers was renamed First Eagle Investment Management, and as of September 2010, it held approximately US$45 billion in assets under management according to its web site.

In 2007, TA Associates bought a minority stake in First Eagle Investment Management from descendants of the founding family.

In December 2015, Blackstone and Corsair Capital bought majority control of the firm from TA Associates and descendants of the founding family.

== Notable employees and alumni ==
- Hans Arnhold re-established Arnhold and S. Bleichroeder, Inc. in 1939 in New York, and hired his son-in-law, Stephen Max Kellen, as CEO in 1940. His daughter, Anna-Maria Arnhold, married Stephen Kellen.
- Stephen M. Kellen was employed in Berlin before heading for England in 1936 to join Lazard Brothers Ltd. in London. In 1937 he moved to New York and worked at Loeb, Rhoades & Co. in New York until he joined Arnhold & S. Bleichroeder. He led the firm as President and CEO for nearly 50 years, fostering the firm's participation in many important Transatlantic deals of the time.
- Henry H. Arnhold was chairman of the Arnhold and S. Bleichroeder bank and its successor businesses from 1960 to 2015.
- Bruce Greenwald, joined the firm in 2009 as Director of Research; after ten years, he retired and remains a Senior Advisor.
- Jim Rogers, joined the firm in 1970 and left in 1973 to form the Quantum Fund with Soros reportedly because new brokerage firm regulation prevented them from getting a percentage of profits.
- George Soros, worked there from 1963–1973.
- Julius Leopold Schwabach, partner at S. Bleichroeder since 1866, led the firm after Bleichröder's death in 1893
- Carl Fürstenberg, worked at S. Bleichroeder from 1871 to 1883
- Edward A. Poppiti, Jr. worked there from 1971-1977.

== Archives and records ==
- Bleichröder Bank collection at Baker Library Special Collections, Harvard Business School.
