= Arnhold Brothers =

German Bank

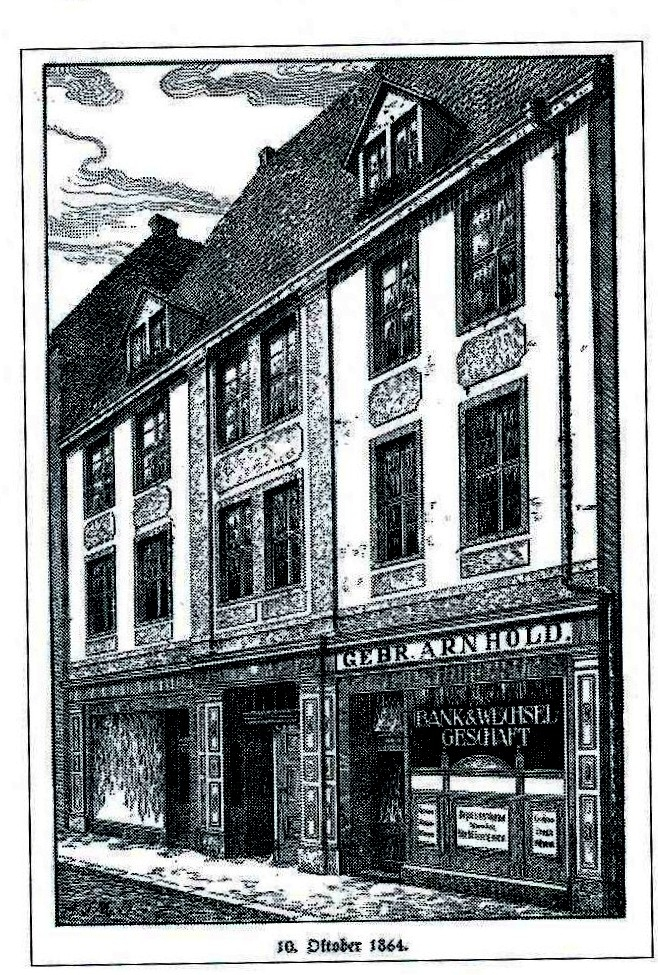
- Arnhold Brothers headquarter's in Dresden
- Native name: Bankhaus Gebrüder Arnhold
- Industry: financial service activities, except insurance and pension funding
- Founded: 1864; 161 years ago in Dresden, German Empire
- Founder: Max Arnhold; Ludwig Philippson
- Defunct: 1931
- Successor: Arnhold and S. Bleichroeder
- Number of employees: 500+ (1925)

Arnhold Brothers (German: Bankhaus Gebrüder Arnhold) was a German private bank founded in 1864 by Max Arnhold and Ludwig Philippson.

== History ==
Gebr. Arnhold was founded in 1864 in Dresden, the banking firm of the Arnhold family, which also had major industrial interests in Germany. Gebr. Arnhold established an office in Berlin in 1907, and after World War I became active in London, Zurich, and New York.

The company was among the top five largest German private banks at the beginning of the 20th century. In 1931 it combined with Berlin-based S. Bleichröder, and after the Nazi Regime got to power, the banking house was merged into New York City based partnership Arnhold and S. Bleichroeder. Since 2009, the new partnership, is known under the name First Eagle Investment Management.

== See also ==
Georg Arnhold
Heinrich Arnhold
Hans Arnhold
Henry H. Arnold

== External sources ==
- Max Arnhold, German Wikipedia
- Simone Lässig, "Jüdische Privatbanken in Dresden" in Hans-Peter Lühr (ed), Dresdner Hefte (in German).
