= Ignacio Bauer =

Spanish banker

Ignacio S. Bauer
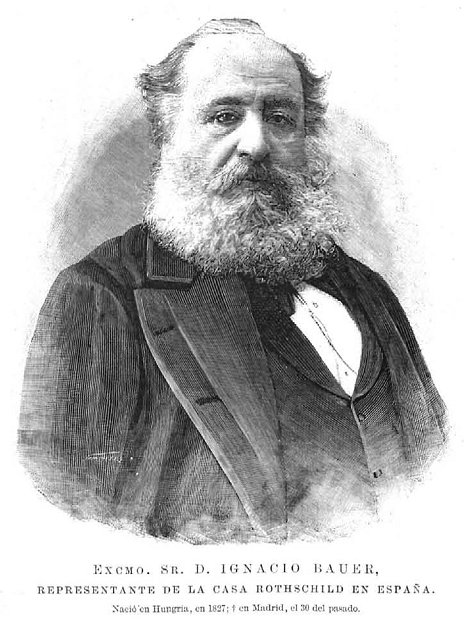
- Ignacio Bauer in La Ilustración Española y Americana
- Born: 1828; Budapest, Hungary
- Died: 1895 (aged 66–67); Madrid, Spain
- Spouse: Ida Morpurgo (m. 1864)

Ignacio Salomón Bauer (1828–1895) was a Hungarian-born Spanish banker of Jewish descent. He was an agent of Rothschild banking house in Madrid, taking over from Daniel Weisweiller in 1853.

In a marriage arranged by James Mayer de Rothschild, he married Ida Morpurgo, daughter of Rothschild's agent in Triest, and later bought the Palacio Bauer as family residence.

The character of Daniel Morton in Benito Pérez Galdós' Gloria (1877) was based on Bauer.
