= Hans Arnhold =

German-American banker (1888–1966)

Hans Arnhold with family

Hans Arnhold (born May 30, 1888 in Dresden; died September 8, 1966 in Lausanne) was a German-American banker.

== Early life ==
Hans Arnhold was the fifth of six children and the youngest son of the Dresden banker Georg Arnhold and his wife Anna, née Beyer (1860-1917). Eduard Arnhold and Max Arnhold were his uncles. Like his brothers Adolf (1884-1950), Heinrich (1885-1935) and Kurt (1887-1951), he joined the family business Bankhaus Gebrüder Arnhold and took over its Berlin representative office.

== Career ==
In 1931, he played a leading role in the partnership with Bankhaus S. Bleichröder. Shortly after the Dresden headquarters of the company, the Berlin branch was also "Aryanized" in 1938.

Arnhold managed to emigrate with his wife Ludmilla, née Heller, and their daughter Anna-Maria, first to Paris and then to the USA in 1939, where he established the New York branch of Arnhold and S. Bleichroeder as the company's new headquarters. The couple's large art collection and library on Avenue Maurice Barres in Paris was confiscated by Reichsleiter Rosenberg's task force in 1941 and could only be partially recovered in 1945.

== Hans Arnhold Center ==
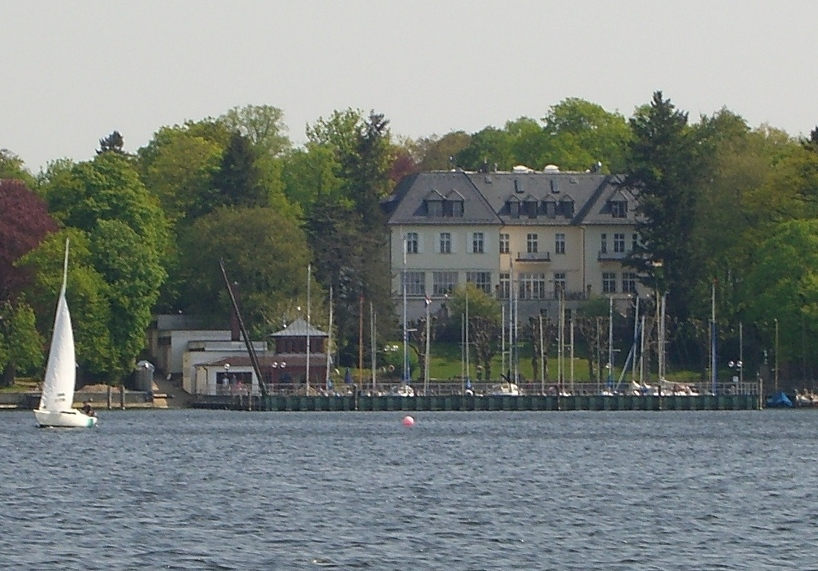
Hans Arnhold Center

From 1926, the Arnhold family lived in a large villa on Wannsee in Berlin, which Reich Minister of Economics Walther Funk acquired in 1939 and which later served as an officers' club for the American army in Berlin. Supported by Hans and Ludmilla Arnhold's daughter Anna-Maria and her husband Stephen M. Kellen, it became the Hans Arnhold Center of the American Academy in Berlin in 1998.

== Literature ==
- Walther Killy, Rudolf Vierhaus: Deutsche biographische Enzyklopädie, Band 1, Saur, München 1999, S. 178
- Dieter G. Maier, Jürgen Nürnberger: Neue Heimat Brasilien – Die Flucht der Familien Levy und Arnhold nach ihren Briefen 1933 bis 1945 (=Jüdische Miniaturen 199), Hentrich und Hentrich Verlag, Berlin 2017, ISBN 978-3-95565-194-7
