= Leonard Krieger =

American historian

Leonard Krieger (28 August 1918 – 12 October 1990) was an American historian who specialized in Modern Europe, especially Germany.

== Life ==
He received his Ph.D. in 1949 from Yale. His dissertation, Liberal Ideas and Institutions in the German Period of Unification, was written under the supervision of Hajo Holborn, the eminent historian.

He was influential as an intellectual historian, and particularly for his discussion of historicism. He has been called "the most intellectual historian in the United States during the Cold War". He was a member of both the American Academy of Arts and Sciences and the American Philosophical Society. One of Krieger's doctoral students, Jonathan Sperber, went on to a distinguished career as a historian of modern Europe and wrote a well-received biography of Karl Marx.

Krieger was born in Newark, New Jersey. His brother was the literary theorist Murray Krieger. He died of progressive supranuclear palsy (PSP) in 1990 in Chicago.

== Works ==
- The German Idea of Freedom (1957)
- The Politics of Discretion (1965)
- "Culture, Cataclysm, and Contingency," The Journal of Modern History Vol. 40, No. 4, December 1968
- Kings and Philosophers 1689-1789 (1970)
- "The Historical Hannah Arendt," The Journal of Modern History Vol. 48, No. 4, December 1976
- Ranke: The Meaning of History (1977)
- Time's Reasons (1989)
- Ideas and Events: Professing History (1992)

== Sources ==
- Carl E. Schorske, "Obituary: Leonard Krieger 1918-1990", Journal of the History of Ideas, Vol. 52, No. 2 (April–June 1991), pp. 340
- Malachi Haim Hacohen, "Review: Leonard Krieger: Historicization and Political Engagement in Intellectual History", History and Theory, Vol. 35, No. 1 (February 1996), pp. 80–130
