= James von Bleichröder =

German Jewish jurist and art collector (1859–1937)

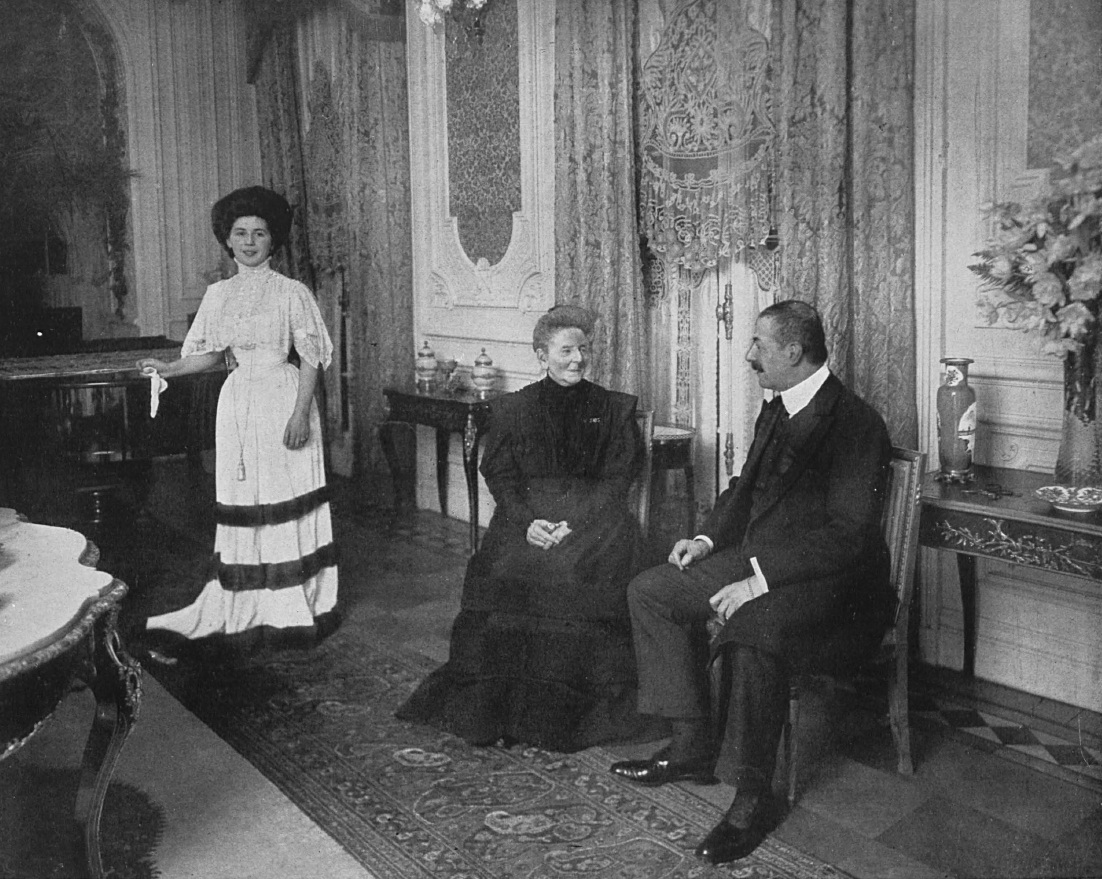
- James von Bleichröder in his Berlin home with the famous singing teacher Mathilde de Castrone-Marchesi (middle) und seiner Gattin, 1908
- Born: October 14, 1872; Berlin, Germany
- Died: April 28, 1937 (aged 64); Berlin
- Occupation: Banker
- Known for: One of the richest people in Prussia beginning of the 20th century
- Spouse: Harriet Alexander (m. 1888; div. 1902) Flora de Saint Riquier Hochberg (m. 1905, divorced) Maria Stade Soydt (m. 1917)
- Children: 5
- Family: Bleichröder banking family

James von Bleichröder (born October 14, 1859 in Berlin; died April 28, 1937 in Berlin) was a German banker of Jewish origin.

== Life ==
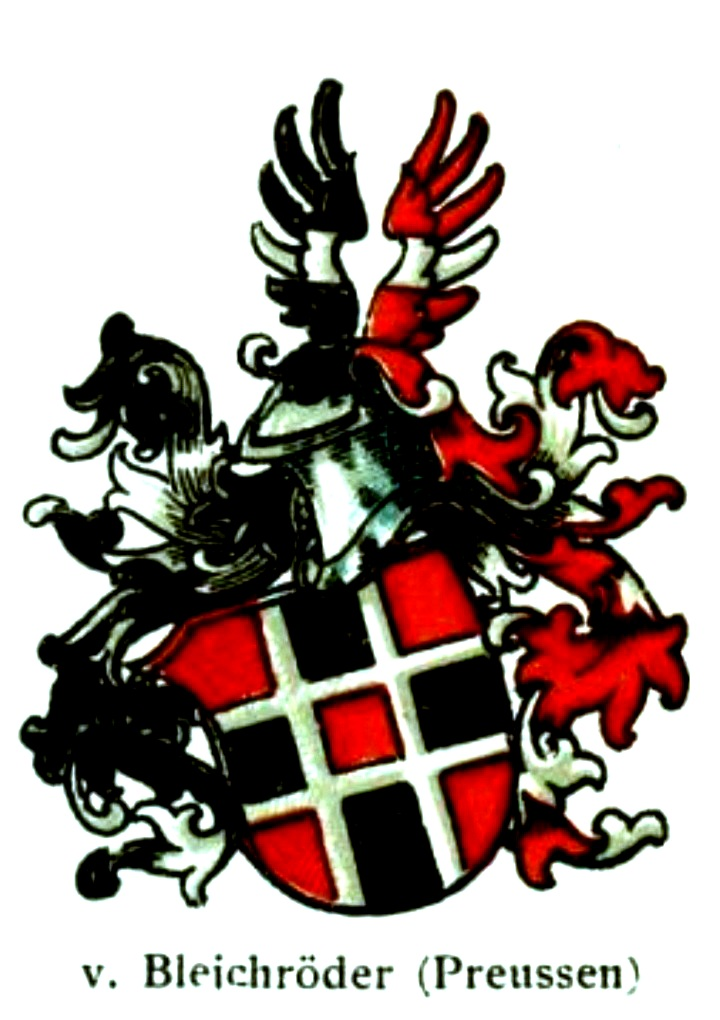
Wappen der 1872 geadelten Familie Bleichröder

James von Bleichröder came from the Bleichröder banking family and was one of three sons of Gerson von Bleichröder, who was known as Bismarck's banker and was elevated to the nobility by Bismarck in 1872. Bleichröder studied law and obtained a doctorate. Together with his brother Georg, he was one of the richest people in Prussia at the beginning of the 20th century. His fortune was estimated at around 20 million marks in 1895 and 1908 (equivalent to today's purchasing power of around 180 million euros).

From his first marriage to Harriet, née Alexander, in 1888 (and divorced in 1902), he had five children, including his daughter Ellie von Bleichröder, who was deported to Theresienstadt concentration camp on July 27, 1942 and liberated there at the end of the war. In 1905, he married the variety artist Flora de Saint Riquier, née Hochberg, in London in his second marriage and Maria Stade, née Soydt, in Berlin in 1917 in his third marriage.

James von Bleichröder took part in the First World War as a cavalry captain.

He was an important promoter of German automobile sport; on May 27, 1902, he gave the then German Automobile Club (D.A.C.; from 1905 to 1918 Kaiserlicher Automobil-Club, K.A.C.; today: Automobilclub von Deutschland, AvD) the Palais Bleichröder at Leipziger Platz 16.[1] He also took part in car races as a driver himself.[2] Around 1910, he donated a hippopotamus to the Berlin Zoo.[3]

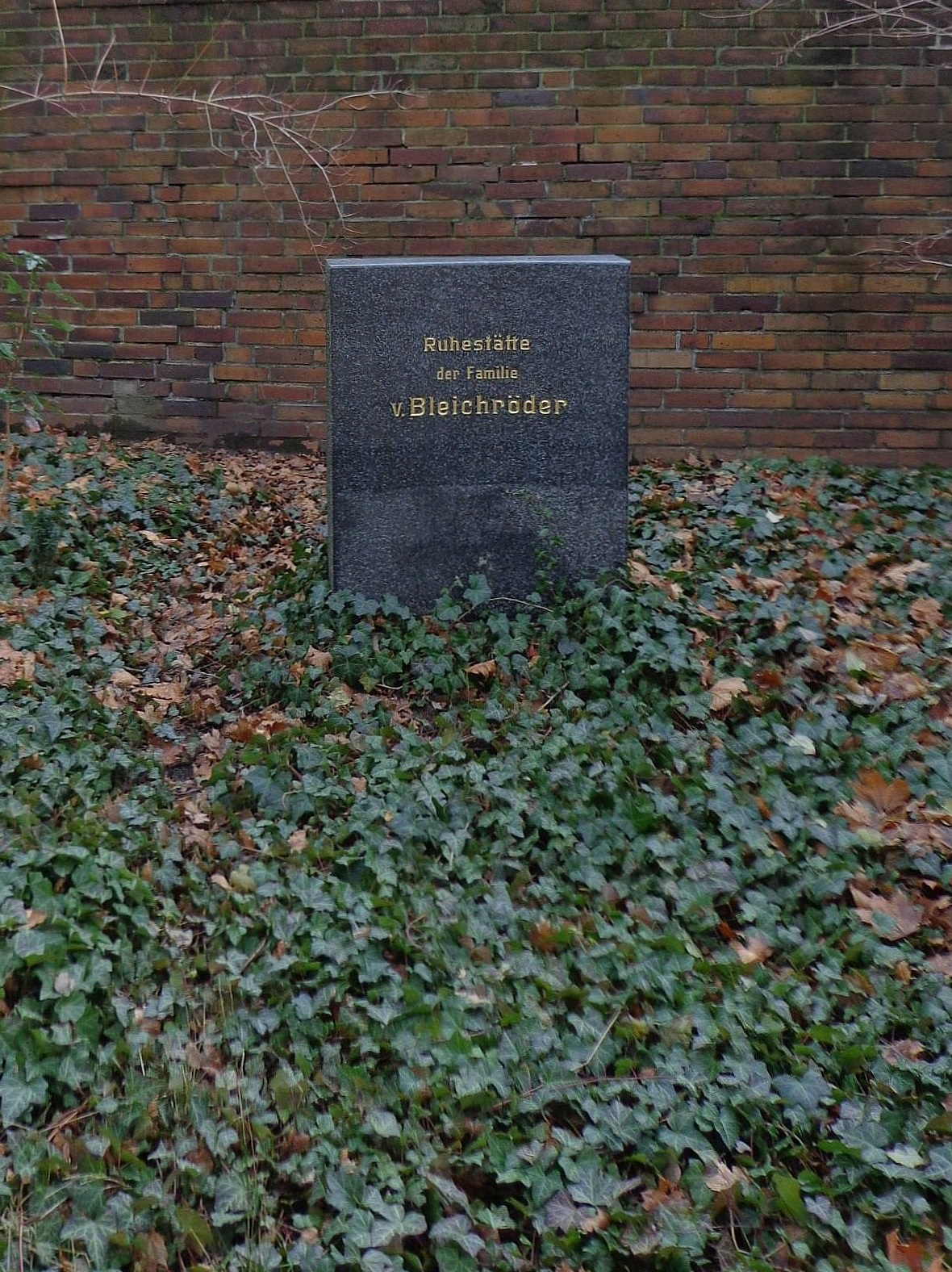
Location of the Bleichröder Mausoleum at the Friedrichsfelde Central Cemetery in Berlin, which was demolished in 1950 on the orders of Wilhelm Pieck

He was buried in 1937 in the Bleichröders' family mausoleum at Friedrichsfelde Central Cemetery, which was demolished in 1950 at the instigation of Wilhelm Pieck.[1] Today, a simple gravestone commemorates the family.

== Art collection and Nazi persecution ==
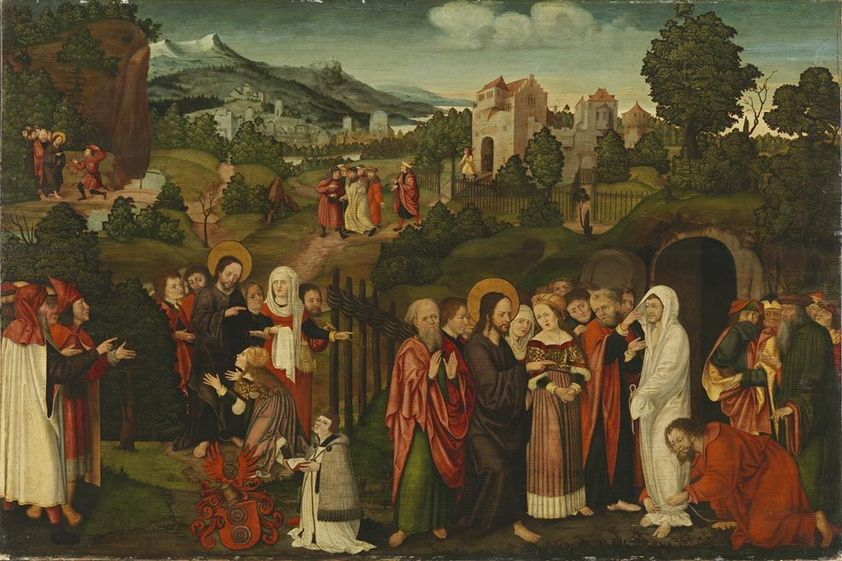
Auferweckung des Lazarus

James von Bleichröder was a collector of antiques and works of art. He owned paintings by Adolph Menzel and Max Liebermann, for example. The collection was auctioned off at the Rudolph Lepke auction house in 1938,[1] with the painting The Raising of Lazarus ending up in Hermann Göring's art collection via the Julius Böhler art dealership in Munich and being transferred from state ownership to the Bavarian State Painting Collections in 1961.

== Claims for Restitution ==
After the heirs of James von Bleichröder, represented by a law firm, demanded restitution, the Bayerische Staatsgemäldesammlungen reached an agreement with the heirs in 2017 to purchase the painting. Bleichröder's heirs currently have 37 Search Requests registered in the German Lost Art Foundation Database.

== Literature ==
- Robert Volz: Reichshandbuch der deutschen Gesellschaft. Das Handbuch der Persönlichkeiten in Wort und Bild. Band 1: A–K. Deutscher Wirtschaftsverlag, Berlin 1930, DNB-IDN 453960286.
