= Winninger =

Surname list

Winninger is a surname. Notable people with the surname include:

- Charles Winninger (1884–1969), American stage and film actor
- David Winninger (born 1949), Canadian provincial politician
- Ray Winninger, American game designer
