= Babette Rothschild =

American psychotherapist and author

Babette Rothschild is an American psychotherapist and author whose work focuses on the psychophysiology of trauma and body-oriented approaches to trauma treatment. Her publications have been discussed and cited in peer-reviewed professional journals and academic literature.

== Work ==
Rothschild is the author of The Body Remembers series, which examines the role of autonomic nervous system processes in traumatic stress and recovery. In The Body Remembers Volume 2: Revolutionizing Trauma Treatment, she presents a conceptual framework describing differentiated sympathetic and parasympathetic arousal states intended to support safer trauma therapy practice.

Her work has been cited by other authors writing on trauma, embodiment, and related areas of psychological wellbeing, including in academic textbooks and edited scholarly volumes published by major academic presses such as W. W. Norton and Routledge.

== Reception and influence ==
In a review published in the International Body Psychotherapy Journal, Merete Holm Brantbjerg describes Rothschild’s model as a “map” designed to help therapists monitor, evaluate, and regulate autonomic nervous system arousal during trauma treatment. The review characterises this contribution as a valuable addition to trauma therapy practice, particularly for its differentiation of autonomic nervous system states beyond commonly cited trauma response models.

Rothschild’s work has also been referenced in academic literature addressing attachment, relationships, and embodied aspects of mental wellbeing, indicating its use across related areas of psychotherapy and trauma-informed practice.

== Somatic and body-oriented trauma therapy ==
Rothschild’s work is frequently discussed in the context of somatic and body-oriented approaches to trauma therapy, which emphasise attention to physiological processes alongside psychological experience. Her writing on autonomic nervous system regulation and trauma has been cited by authors working within body psychotherapy and related trauma-focused traditions.

In professional literature, Rothschild’s contributions are situated among broader efforts to develop trauma therapy frameworks that account for bodily responses, arousal regulation, and safety in therapeutic practice.

== Selected publications ==
- The Body Remembers: The Psychophysiology of Trauma and Trauma Treatment (2000)
- The Body Remembers Casebook: Unifying Methods and Models in the Treatment of Trauma and PTSD
- Revolutionizing Trauma Treatment
- Help for the Helper: The Psychophysiology of Compassion Fatigue and Vicarious Trauma
