= Fritz Stern =

American historian (1926–2016)

Fritz R. Stern
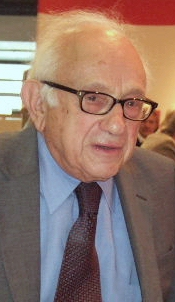
- Born: February 2, 1926; Breslau, Silesia, Weimar Republic (now Wrocław, Poland)
- Died: May 18, 2016 (aged 90); New York, New York, U.S.
- Education: Columbia University
- Scientific career
- Fields: Historiography
- Workplaces: Columbia University

Fritz Richard Stern (February 2, 1926 – May 18, 2016) was a German-born American historian of German history, Jewish history and historiography. He was a University Professor and a provost at New York's Columbia University. His work focused on the complex relationships between Germans and Jews in the 19th and 20th centuries and on the rise of National Socialism in Germany during the first half of the 20th century.

== Biography ==
Stern was born on February 2, 1926, in Breslau, Germany (now Wrocław, Poland), to a locally-prominent medical family of Jewish heritage. His father, Rudolf Stern, was a physician, medical researcher and a veteran of the First World War. His mother, Käthe Stern, was a noted theorist, practitioner and reformer in the field of education for young children. Through family, friends, and colleagues, they were connected with several leading scientific and cultural figures in Europe and later in the United States. For example, when trying to decide on his career objective while in college, Stern discussed choosing between history and medicine with Albert Einstein.

The family had converted from Judaism to Lutheranism in the late 19th century and shared the increasingly-secular world view that was frequently found among Germany's educated classes. Stern was baptized shortly after his birth and named after his godfather, another member of Breslau's intellectual élite, the Nobel Prize winner Fritz Haber (also a Christian convert from Judaism). The Stern family's plight suffered in under the Nazi regime, similar to that of other Germans branded Jewish by the Nazis. His memoirs describe his experience (although not Jewish) facing an antisemitic Nazi teacher, who infamously presented a math problem: "If three Jews robbed a bank, and each got a part of the loot proportionate to their ages ... how much would each get?" The Sterns emigrated to the United States in 1938 to escape the virulent anti-Jewish policies of Adolf Hitler's National Socialist government and the increasing violence against all Germans of Jewish ancestry.

The family settled in Jackson Heights, Queens, where Stern spent the remainder of his childhood. He attended public school and quickly learned English while his parents re-established their respective careers. He then attended Columbia University, where he received his bachelor's, master's and doctoral degrees. His professors included Lionel Trilling.

From 1953 to 1997, he served as a professor at Columbia, obtaining the eminent Seth Low chair before attaining the rank of University Professor. Stern also briefly served as provost of the university.

Beginning in 1954, Stern taught frequently as a guest lecturer at the Free University in West Berlin.

In 1990, he helped persuade British Prime Minister Margaret Thatcher that a reunited Germany firmly anchored in the West would pose no threat to the rest of Europe. In 1993 to 1994, Stern served as an adviser to the US ambassador to Germany, Richard Holbrooke. In 2010, Stern spoke at the former German military headquarters building, the Bendlerblock, on the 66th anniversary of an assassination attempt on Hitler.

Looking back in January 2016, he told an interviewer, "Sometimes I bemoaned the fact that I had to grow up amid the disintegration of a democracy; now, at the end of life, I am having to experience again the struggles of democracy."

Stern died on May 18, 2016, in New York, at 90.

== Scholarship ==
The focus of much of Stern's work an attempt to track the development of the rise of National Socialism in Germany and its characteristics. Stern traced the origins of Nazism back to the 19th-century völkische movement. Stern considered that the virulent antisemitic völkische movement to have been the result of the "politics of cultural despair" experienced by German intellectuals, who were unable to come to grips with modernity. However, Stern rejected the Sonderweg interpretation of German history and considered the ideas of the völkische movement to have been merely a "dark undercurrent" in 19th-century German society.

In the 1990s, Stern was a leading critic of the controversial American author Daniel Goldhagen, whose book Hitler's Willing Executioners was denounced by Stern as unscholarly and full of Germanophobia.

Another major area of research for Stern was the history of the Jewish community in Germany and how the Jewish culture influenced German culture and vice versa. In Stern's view, the interaction produced what Stern often called the "Jewish-German symbiosis". In Stern's view, the best example of the "Jewish-German symbiosis" was Albert Einstein.

== Selected works ==
=== Author ===
- The Politics Of Cultural Despair: A Study In The Rise Of The Germanic Ideology, Berkeley, University of California Press, 1961, 1963. Adapted from Stern's dissertation; essays on Paul de Lagarde, Julius Langbehn, and Arthur Moeller van den Bruck.
- The Failure Of Illiberalism: Essays on the Political Culture of Modern Germany, London, George Allen & Unwin, 1972, ISBN 0-04-943019-X. A collection of essays.
- Gold and Iron: Bismarck, Bleichröder, and the Building of the German Empire, New York: Knopf, 1977, ISBN 0-394-49545-4. A dual biography of banker Gerson Bleichröder and Otto von Bismarck.
- Germany 1933: Fifty Years Later, New York: Leo Baeck Institute, 1984. Leo Baeck memorial lecture.
- Dreams and Delusions: The Drama Of German History, New York: Knopf, 1987, ISBN 0-394-55995-9. A collection of essays.
- Einstein's German World, Princeton: Princeton University Press, 1999, ISBN 0-691-05939-X.
- (in German) Friedenspreis des deutschen Buchhandels: Ansprachen aus Anlass der Verleihung, Frankfurt am Main: Börsenverein des Deutschen Buchhandels e.V. im Verlag der Buchhändler-Vereinigung GmbH, 1999.
- Five Germanies I Have Known, New York: Farrar, Straus and Giroux, 2006, ISBN 0-374-15540-2. Autobiography.
- "Imperial Hubris: A German Tale, War, Wilhelm II, and the consequences of leadership", Lapham's Quarterly, Winter 2008.

=== Co-author ===
- (in German) with Helmut Schmidt, Unser Jahrhundert: Ein Gespräch. C.H. Beck, München, 2010. A conversation between the historian and the former German chancellor
- with Elizabeth Sifton, No Ordinary Men: Dietrich Bonhoeffer and Hans von Dohnanyi, Resisters against Hitler in Church and State, (New York Review Books Collections: 2013, ISBN 978-1-59017-681-8.

Editor

- The Varieties of History: From Voltaire to the Present, New York: Meridian Books, 1956, 1960, 1972, 1973, ISBN 0-394-71962-X.
- co-edited with Leonard Krieger, The Responsibility of Power: Historical Essays In Honor of Hajo Holborn, London: Macmillan, 1968, 1967. A survey of historiography from the eighteenth century to the twentieth.

== Honors ==
- 1969: Elected member of the American Academy of Arts and Sciences
- 1984: Dr. Leopold Lucas Prize (jointly with Hans Jonas) of the University of Tübingen
- 1988: Elected member of the American Philosophical Society
- 1994: Pour le mérite für Wissenschaft und Künste
- 1999: Friedenspreis des Deutschen Buchhandels
- 1999: Humboldt Prize, Alexander von Humboldt Foundation
- 2002: Honorary doctor of the University of Wrocław
- 2004: Leo Baeck Medal, Leo Baeck Institute
- 2005: The German National Prize
- 2006: Großes Verdienstkreuz des Verdienstordens der Bundesrepublik Deutschland mit Stern und Schulterband
- 2007: Preis für Verständigung und Toleranz, Jewish Museum Berlin
- 2007: Livetime Achievement Award, American Historical Association
- 2007: Jacques Barzun Prize for Cultural History, American Philosophical Society
- 2008: Internationaler Brückepreis
- 2009: Marion Dönhoff Prize
- 2013: Volkmar and Margret Sander Prize

The Fritz Stern Professorship at the University of Wrocław was established in his honor in 2009. The first person appointed to hold that chair was former German President Richard von Weizsäcker.
