= Jonathan Sperber =

American professor and historian

- Born: 26 December 1952 (age 73); New York City, NY
- Occupations: Professor; Historian
- Spouse: Nancy Lynn Katzman
- Children: Adam Philip

Academic background
- Education: Abraham Lincoln High School
- Alma mater: Cornell University (AB); University of Chicago (PhD)
- Doctoral advisor: Leonard Krieger

Academic work
- Discipline: History
- Institutions: University of Missouri
- Main interests: Modern Germany

Jonathan Sperber (born 26 December 1952) is an American academic and historian who is a professor emeritus at the University of Missouri and author of modern European History.

== Early life and academic career ==
Jonathan Sperber was born on 26 December 1952 in New York City, to Louis and Ruth Sperber. He attended the Abraham Lincoln High School in Brooklyn. Sperber was an undergraduate at Cornell University from 1969 to 1973 and went to graduate school at the University of Chicago. While there, he studied with historian Leonard Krieger. He received his Ph.D. from Chicago in 1980. He was an archivist at the Leo Baeck Institute in New York from 1979 to 1982, and, after a brief visiting professorship at Northwestern University from 1982 to1984, went to work at the University of Missouri in 1984, where he still resides. At Missouri, he was assistant professor (1984–87), associate professor (1987–92) and professor of history (1992–2003). He was appointed Curators’ Professor of History in 2003, and served as chair of the history department between 2005 and 2010. He is a member of the German Studies Association and the American Historical Association.

== Author ==
Sperber has written a number of books on the political, social and religious history of nineteenth-century Europe. Karl Marx: A Nineteenth-Century Life (2013), was well reviewed, described by The New York Times as an "absorbing, meticulously researched biography" in its Editors Choice Book Review. The book was a 2014 Pulitzer Prize Finalist in Biography. The book was also named one of the Best Books of the Year by Publishers Weekly and Book Riot.

== Personal life ==
Sperber is married to Nancy Lynn Katzman and has one son, Adam Philip.

== Awards and fellowships ==
- German Academic Exchange Service Fellowship, 1976–78, 1986, 1999
- Herbert Baxter Adams Prize, American Historical Association for the best first book in European history by an American author for Popular Catholicism in Nineteenth-Century Germany, 1985
- Visiting research fellow, Alexander von Humboldt Stiftung at the University of Cologne, 1987–88
- John Simon Guggenheim Memorial Foundation Fellowship, 1988–89
- German Studies Association Prize for the best book on German history or politics, for Rhineland Radicals, 1993
- American Philosophical Society Fellow, 1994
- Alan Sharlin Memorial Prize of the Social Science History Association awarded for the best book in social science history for The Kaiser's Voters, 1998
- National Endowment for the Humanities Fellow for college and university teachers, 2001-02

== Bibliography ==
- Popular Catholicism in Nineteenth-Century Germany (Princeton University Press, 1984, ISBN 9780691054322)
- Rhineland Radicals: The Democratic Movement and the Revolution of 1848–1849 (Princeton University Press, 1992, ISBN 9780691008660)
- The Kaiser's Voters: Electors and Elections in Imperial Germany (Cambridge University Press, 1997, ISBN 9780521591386)
- Revolutionary Europe, 1780–1850 (Routledge, 2000, ISBN 9780582294462)
- Europe in 1848: Revolution and Reform (Berghahn Books, 2001, ISBN 9781800733602, 1800733607)
- Germany, 1800–1870 (Oxford University Press, 2004, ISBN 0199258384, 9780199258383)
- Property and Civil Society in South-Western Germany 1820–1914 (Oxford University Press, 2005, ISBN 9780199284757)
- The European Revolutions, 1848-1851 (New Approaches to European History) (Cambridge University Press, 2005, ISBN 9780521547796)
- Europe 1850–1914: Progress, Participation and Apprehension (Routledge, 2008, ISBN 9781405801348)
- Karl Marx: A Nineteenth-Century Life (Liveright, 2013, ISBN 9780871404671)
- Bourgeois Europe, 1850–1914 2nd Ed. (Routledge, 2022, ISBN 9780815364795)
- The Age of Interconnection: A Global History of the Second Half of the Twentieth Century (Oxford University Press, 2023, ISBN 9780190918958)
