= S. Bleichröder =

Former German bank

S. Bleichröder Bank
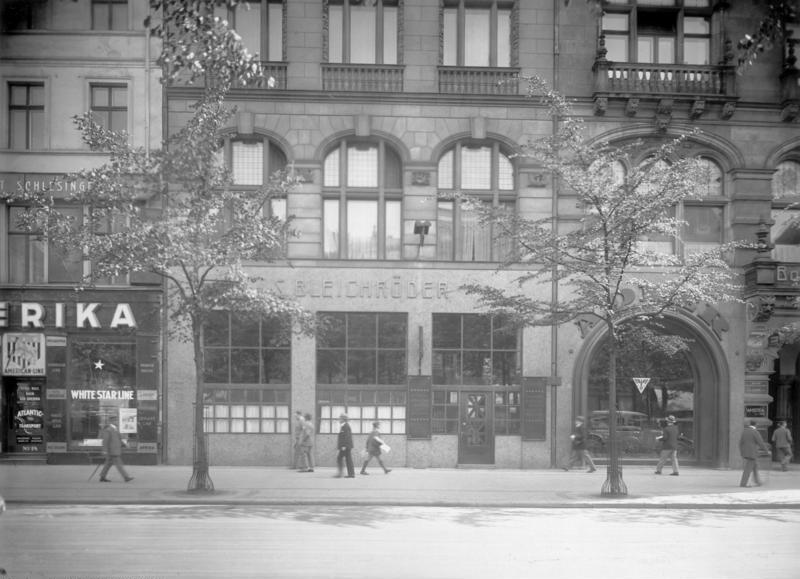
- Former front of Bleichröder Bank in Berlin, Unter den Lindeen 13 (renumbered 51 in the 1930s), photographed in 1929
- Type: Bank
- Industry: Financial services
- Founded: 1803
- Founder: Samuel Bleichröder
- Defunct: 1931
- Fate: Merged
- Successor: Arnhold and S. Bleichroeder
- Headquarters: Berlin, Germany
- Products: Banking services

S. Bleichröder was a German family-controlled bank based in Berlin, founded in 1803 by Samuel Bleichröder. As an agent of the German Rothschild Bank, it was developed by Samuel's son Gerson von Bleichröder, who became known as "Bismarck's banker".

The firm declined in importance in the early 20th century and was eventually acquired in 1931 by Dresden-based Arnhold Brothers to form Arnhold and S. Bleichroeder.

== History ==
Samuel Bleichröder (1779–1855), who came from an observant Jewish family originally based in Bleicherode, a town in the Prussian province of Saxony, founded a currency exchange business on Rosenthaler Strasse in the center of Berlin. The firm rose to significance in 1828, when it became the Berlin agent of Frankfurt-based M. A. Rothschild & Söhne. Bleichröder subsequently became a significant financier to the Kingdom of Prussia, and in 1845 was also involved in financing the Cologne-Minden Railway Company.

From 1855 onwards, Samuel's son Gerson Bleichröder (1822-1893), who was also an observant Jew, continued the business, while his brother Julius Bleichröder left around 1860 and founded his own banking firm. Gerson Bleichröder made S. Bleichröder prominent in the transfer of credits or placing of loans on behalf of the Prussian state and, from 1871 on, of the German Empire. He also managed the private banking transactions of Otto von Bismarck. Together with other banks, including Mendelssohn & Co., Bleichröder managed the processing of French reparation payments following the Franco-Prussian War and financed the build-up of the government-owned Prussian state railways. Until the 1880s, the bank was also, alongside Maurice de Hirsch, the most important German investor in the Ottoman Empire. In 1889, it was among the three largest investors in the foundation of the Deutsch-Asiatische Bank in Shanghai, together with Disconto-Gesellschaft and Deutsche Bank.

After Gerson's death in 1893, his brother-in-law Julius Leopold Schwabach (1831-1898), a partner since 1870, became the bank's senior partner. Gerson's three sons had also become partners, namely Hans von Bleichröder (since around 1881), Georg von Bleichröder (since around 1887) and James von Bleichröder (since 1893). In 1896, Julius Leopold Schwabach's son Paul joined the bank.

After the First World War, the importance of the Bleichröder Bank declined significantly. In 1918-1921, Bleichröder established cross-shareholdings with the Aufhäuser Bank in Munich. It incurred losses in the European banking crisis of 1931, precipitating the merger with Arnhold Brothers that same year.

== See also ==
- Sal. Oppenheim
- M. A. Rothschild & Söhne
- Mendelssohn & Co.
- List of banks in Germany
