= M. A. Rothschild & Söhne =

Former German private bank

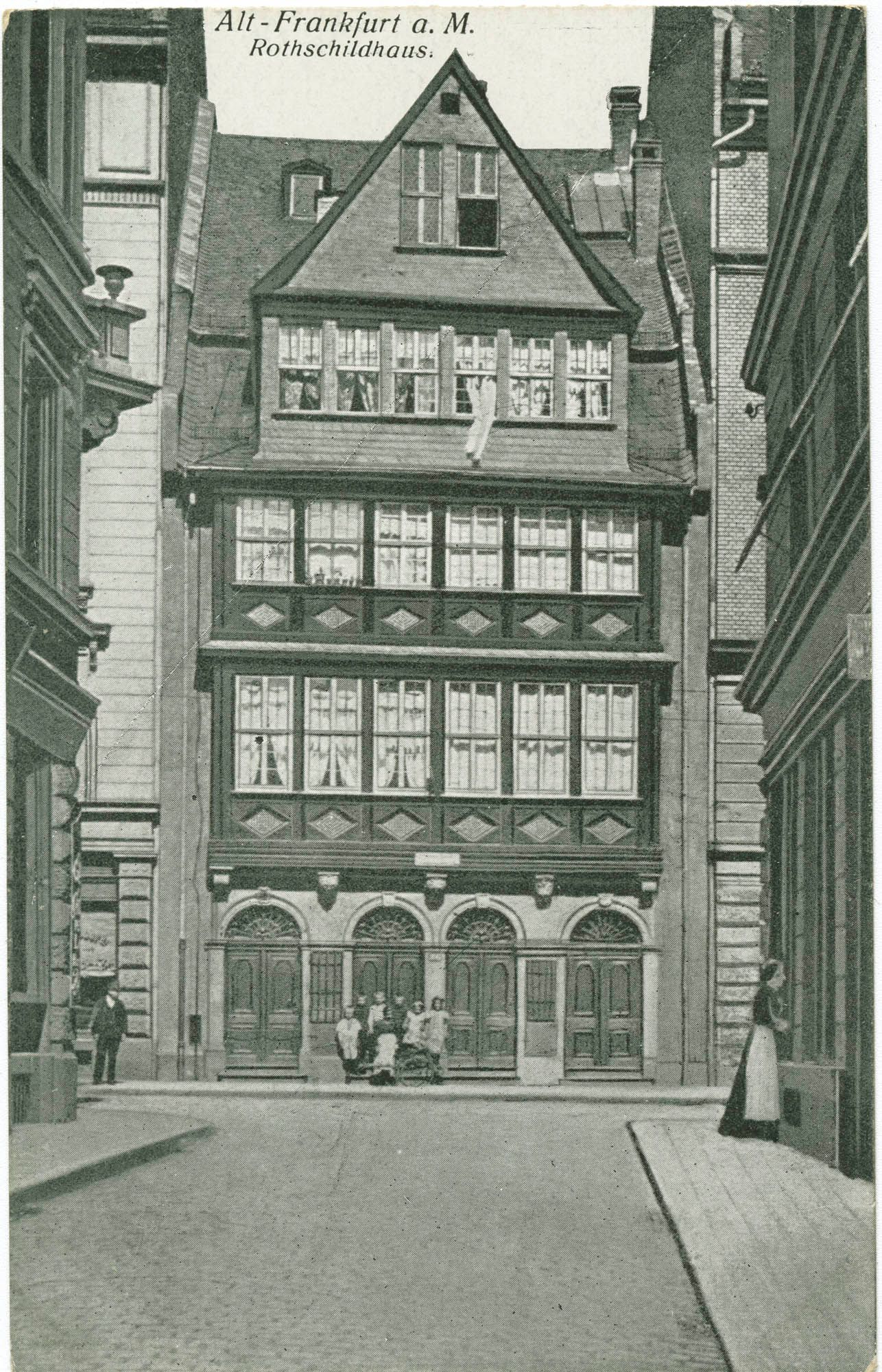
The Rothschild family's house in Frankfurt's Judengasse, the bank's original seat

M. A. Rothschild & Söhne was a German family-controlled bank based in Frankfurt, formally founded in 1810 by Mayer Amschel Rothschild on the basis of the banking business he had developed since 1766. It was eventually liquidated in 1901.

== Overview ==
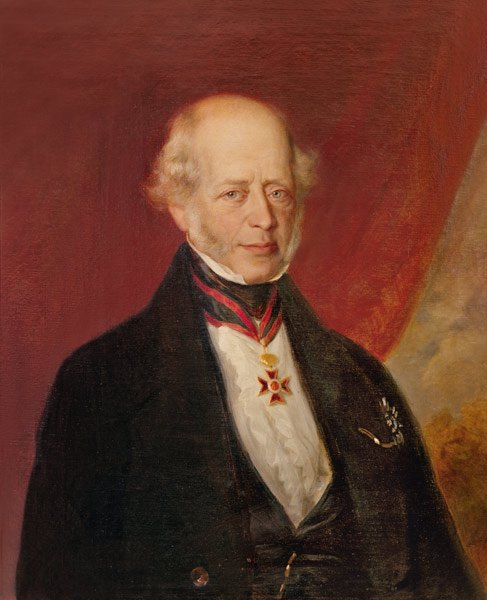
Amschel Mayer von Rothschild (1773–1855) took over the bank two years after it had been established by his father

Mayer Amschel Rothschild (1744–1812) founded the bank as a partnership including himself and his five sons Amschel, Salomon, Nathan, Carl and Jakob (later known as James). Upon Mayer Amschel's death in 1812, his eldest son Amschel (1773–1855) took over the firm's leadership and in 1813 commissioned a new building at Fahrgasse 146 (corner of Fahrgasse and Judengasse) from the municipal building inspector Philipp Jakob Hoffmann. Following the end of the Napoleonic Wars, the five brothers concluded a new partnership agreement among themselves. In 1822 the five brothers were awarded the hereditary title of Baron by Emperor Francis I of Austria, after which the name of the Frankfurt firm was changed to “M.A. von Rothschild & Söhne”.

Amschel Mayer von Rothschild concentrated on serving the financial needs of various German princes and monarchs, including maintaining the relationship that his father had built with the Electorate of Hesse together with Hessian official Carl Friedrich Buderus von Carlshausen. M. A. Rothschild & Söhne was thus able to displace the Frankfurt-based Bethmann family as the leading issuer of government bonds in the German-speaking region between 1820 and 1830. The Rothschild bank mostly stayed away from industrial bonds and shares issuance, but was indirectly involved in such transactions by providing loans to other banks such as Sal. Oppenheim in Cologne. One exception was the Rothschild participation in a consortium to build the Taunus Railway in 1835. In 1854, the Rothschild bank was instrumental in the creation of the Frankfurter Bank. Overall, however, the bank lost relative importance to the rapidly expanding Rothschild banks in London, Paris, and Vienna, even though the latter were still formally operating as branches of the Frankfurt partnership.

After Amschel's death in 1855, the management of the bank officially passed to his nephews Mayer Carl von Rothschild (1820–1886) and Wilhelm Carl von Rothschild (1828–1901), both of which had been partners since 1852. From then on, the bank was managed prudently but increasingly lost prominence against more dynamic competitors, whether private banking houses or the growing number of joint-stock institutions. M. A. Rothschild & Söhne still partnered with Vienna-based S. M. von Rothschild, the Rothschild-controlled Creditanstalt, and Berlin-based Disconto-Gesellschaft, as well as (albeit later on) the Darmstädter Bank. In 1889, it also participated in the foundation of the Deutsch-Asiatische Bank in Shanghai.

With the death of Wilhelm Carl von Rothschild in 1901, the Frankfurt Rothschilds' male line was extinguished and the bank went into an orderly liquidation process. The business was taken over by the Disconto-Gesellschaft and formed the basis for its Frankfurt branch. Most of the bank's archives were destroyed in 1901 on the orders of the surviving members of the Rothschild family.

== See also ==
- Mendelssohn & Co.
- S. Bleichröder
- List of banks in Germany
