= Salomon Wininger =

Austrian-Jewish biographer (1877–1968)

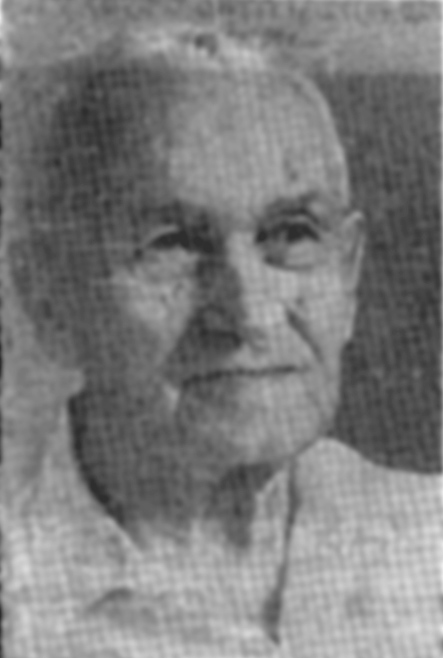
- Native name: שלמה וִינִינגֶר
- Born: 13 December 1877; Gura Humora, Bukovina
- Died: December 1968; Ramat Gan, Israel

Salomon Wininger (Hebrew: שלמה וִינִינגֶר; 13 December 1877, Gura Humora, Bukovina – December 1968, in Ramat Gan, Israel) was an Austrian-Jewish biographer. He has been called one of the greatest Jewish biographers of all time.

Before World War I, Wininger lived in Chernivtsi and moved to Vienna during the war years, where he decided to write biographies of famous Jews. This idea was pushed in order to counter the self-hating mood of Jewish youth in the city, influenced among other political factors, by Otto Weininger's works.

After his return to Chernivtsi in 1921, Shlomo Wininger wrote about 13,000 biographies and published them in seven volumes between 1925 and 1936. He survived the time of World War II in Chernivtsi and emigrated in 1951 to Israel.

== Works ==
- Große Jüdische National-Biographie ("Lexicon of Jewish National Biographies"). Chernivtsi 1925–1936.
- Gura Humora: Geschichte einer Kleinstadt in der Südbukovina ("Gura Humora: History of a Small Town in South Bukovina").
