= Daniel Weisweiller =

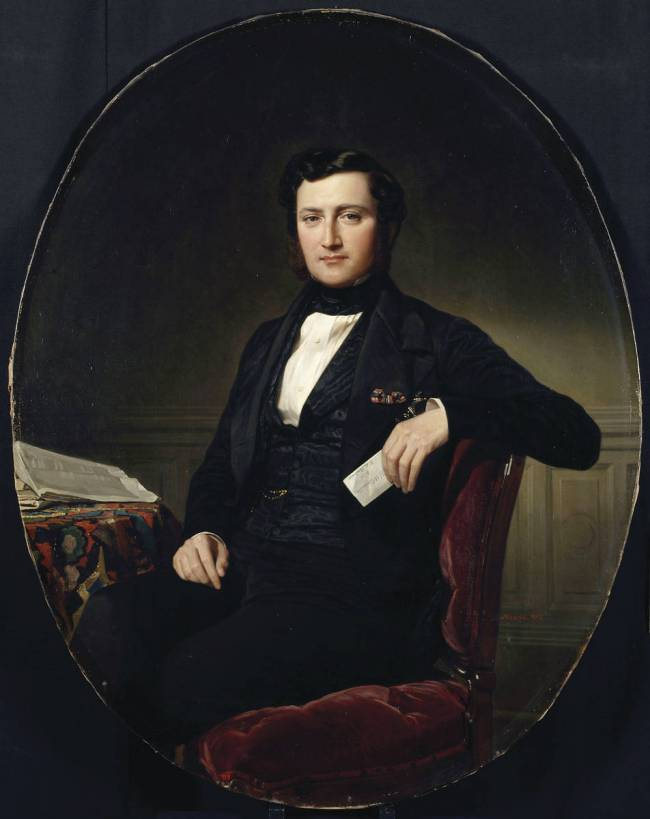
- Born: 1814; Frankfurt, Germany
- Died: 13 January 1892 (aged 77–78); Paris, France
- Occupation: Banker
- Spouse: Adeline Matilda Helbert (m. 1843)

Daniel Bernard Weisweiller (1814 – 13 January 1892) was a German-born Spanish banker of Jewish descent. He was an agent of Rothschild banking house in Madrid, taking over from Lionel de Rothschild in 1834. According to Niall Ferguson, Weisweiller was "the most important Rothschild agent in the 1830s."

Weisweiller married Adeline Helbert in 1843. The couple had one daughter, Adela Weisweiller (1845–1925) who married André Capron, the mayor of Cannes (1902–1928).
