= First Eagle Investments =

American investment management company

- Type: Private
- Industry: Investment management
- Founded: 1864
- Headquarters: 1345 Avenue of the Americas; New York City, U.S.
- Key people: Mehdi Mahmud, President and Chief Executive Officer
- Products: Mutual funds, ETFs, SMAs, Interval Funds, Private Funds
- Number of employees: 623 (2025)
- Website: www.firsteagle.com

First Eagle Investments is an American investment management firm headquartered in New York City. Founded in 1864 in Dresden, Germany, as Arnhold Brothers, the firm relocated to the United States in the 1930s. Over the years, it has evolved into a prominent asset manager, offering a range of investment strategies across equities, fixed income, multi-asset, and alternative credit. As of December 31, 2025, First Eagle Investments manages approximately $181 billion in assets and operates eight offices worldwide.

== History ==
First Eagle Investments traces its origins to 1864 when the family owned bank, Arnhold Brothers, was established in Dresden, Germany. In 1928, it purchased Adler Bank in Switzerland, which would contribute to its future name, as "Adler" was German for "Eagle". In 1931, the firm merged with S. Bleichröder to form Arnhold and S. Bleichroeder. The company’s leadership emigrated to New York City and resumed operations on Wall Street in 1937, followed by launching its first offshore fund, First Eagle Fund N.V., in 1967 and its first U.S.-registered mutual fund, the First Eagle Fund of America, in 1987.

In 1999, Arnhold and S. Bleichroeder acquired a majority stake in Société Générale Asset Management, the asset management arm of the French bank Société Générale. The transaction positioned the firm to advise the First Eagle Funds, including the SocGen International Fund, later renamed the First Eagle Global Fund. The team managing these strategies became First Eagle's Global Value Team.

In 2002, the firm exited its investment banking operations and global businesses to focus solely on investment management. In 2007, private equity firm TA Associates purchased a minority interest in the company. Two years later in 2009, the firm was renamed First Eagle Investment Management.

In 2015, Blackstone Inc. and Corsair Capital acquired a majority stake in the firm.

First Eagle expanded its alternative credit capabilities through the acquisition of NewStar Financial in 2017, followed by the acquisition of THL Credit Advisors in 2020, later renamed First Eagle Alternative Credit.

In 2021 the firm established a new Small Cap team under the leadership of Bill Hench who had previously managed key small cap strategies and funds at Royce Investment Partners. The same year, the firm changed its name into First Eagle Investments.

In 2022, First Eagle Investments completed the acquisition of Napier Park Global Capital, an alternative credit manager with approximately $19.5 billion in assets under management. The deal expanded First Eagle’s alternative credit platform and allowed the firm to diversify its investment offerings.

In 2023, the firm establish a new High Yield Municipal Credit team under the leadership of John Miller, who had previously spent almost three decades leading a municipal team at Nuveen Investments.

In February 2025, Blackstone Group initiated a sale of its majority stake in the firm, seeking to capitalize on growth in the asset management sector. First Eagle’s assets had grown by approximately 50% since Blackstone’s 2015 investment. In August 2025, First Eagle announced that leading private equity firm Genstar Capital had made a majority investment in the firm.

== Funds ==
As of 2025, First Eagle Investments has five investment teams: Global Value, Small Cap, Municipal Credit, First Eagle Alternative Credit, and Napier Park.

Prominent funds managed by First Eagle Investments include: First Eagle Global Fund, the firm’s flagship offering, First Eagle Overseas Fund focused on non-U.S. companies, First Eagle U.S. Fund investing primarily in U.S. equities, and First Eagle Gold Fund providing exposure to gold and gold-mining stocks. In fixed income, the First Eagle High Yield Municipal Fund targets below-investment-grade bonds, and the firm’s credit-oriented offering is the First Eagle Credit Opportunities Fund.

In the ETF space, First Eagle launched the First Eagle Global Equity ETF and the First Eagle Overseas Equity ETF, which seek long-term capital appreciation by investing primarily in a diversified portfolio of equity securities issued by companies located throughout the world. Two additional active equity ETFs were launched in January 2026.
