= Institute for Spatial Policies =

Slovene research institute

Inštitut za politike prostora Institute for Spatial Policies
- Founders: Blaž Križnik, Marko Peterlin, Peter Šenk, Tadej Žaucer
- Established: 2006
- Director: Marko Peterlin
- Address: Tržaška 2, Ljubljana
- Location: Ljubljana, Slovenia
- Website: www.ipop.si

Institute for Spatial Policies (Slovene: Inštitut za politike prostora, IPoP) is an independent research and consultancy as well as non-governmental and non-profit organization active in the field of spatial and urban development. It was established in Ljubljana in 2006 with the aim to integrate knowledge and experience of different sciences and practices dealing with space and place. The institute cooperates with a variety of experts, civil society groups and formal institutions, in order to develop a network of complementary organizations related to the field of spatial and urban development. In this way the institute tries to create conditions for a common understanding of challenges, goals and solutions, leading to effective spatial and urban planning. Their work is focused on the processes of producing space and place from a bottom up perspective and emphasizes the importance of long-term thinking, participative decision-making processes and sustainable spatial and urban planning.

The institute has become a leading non-governmental organization in Slovenia dealing with spatial and urban development. In 2009 the Institute for Spatial Policies started Network for Spatial Development (Slovene: Mreža za prostor), an initiative aimed to connect and strengthen the role of civil society in spatial and urban planning and related decision-making processes in Slovenia. The initiative was further extended in 2010 in partnership with the Legal Information Centre for the NGOs and Trajekt and now includes more than fifteen member organizations. The institute acts as Slovene URBACT dissemination point together with Trajekt. In 2011 the institute became one of the founding members of the Tabor Cultural Quarter Association (Slovene: Kulturna četrt Tabor), a civic initiative trying to improve cultural and everyday life in Ljubljana. The institute also organizes Jane's Walk in Slovenia, a world-wide community event celebrating the legacy of Jane Jacobs.
