= Economic history of Australia =

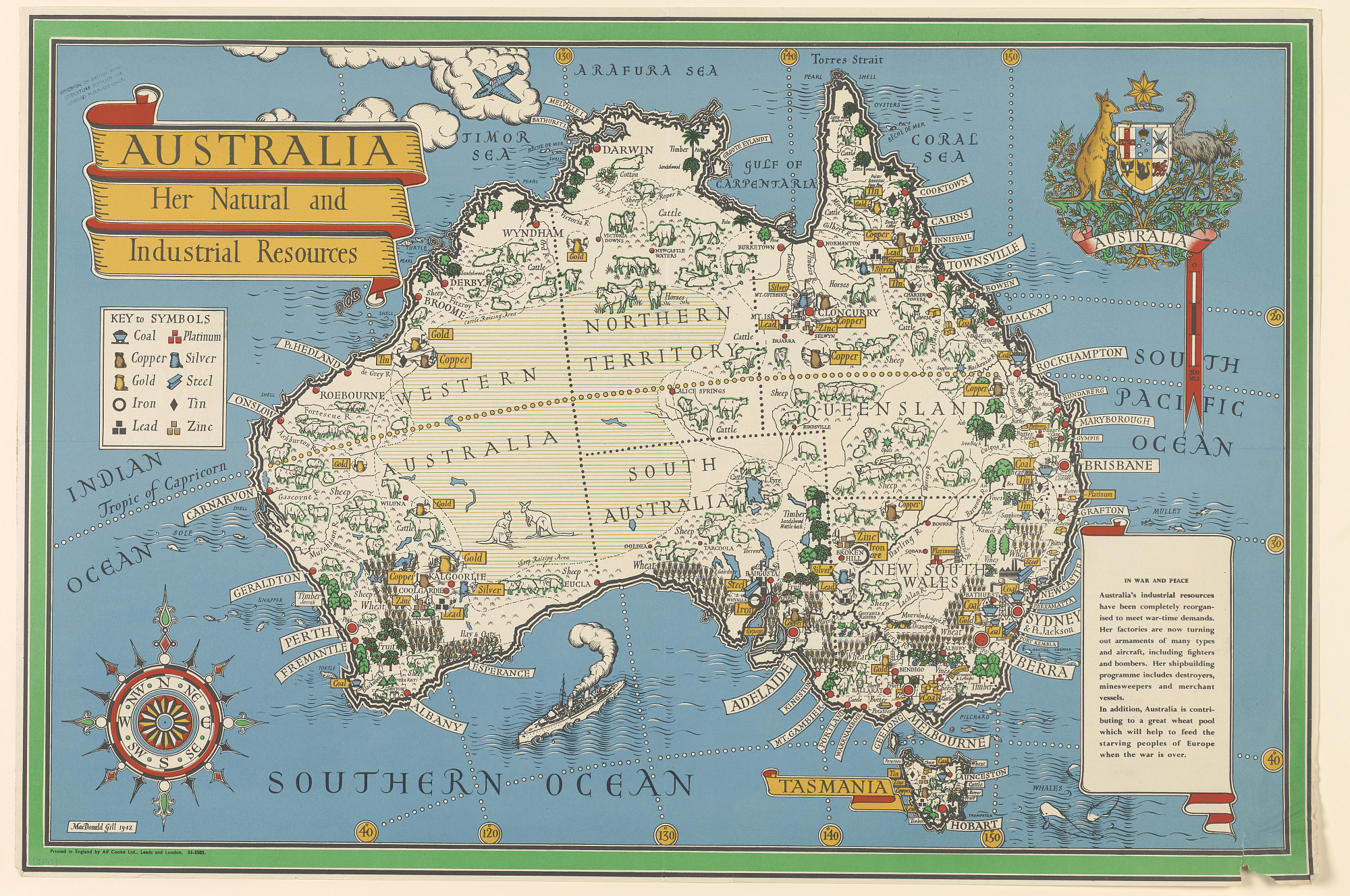
1942 pictorial map of Australia showing its natural wealth and resources

The economic history of Australia traces the economic history of Australia since European settlement in 1788.

== 1788–1821 ==
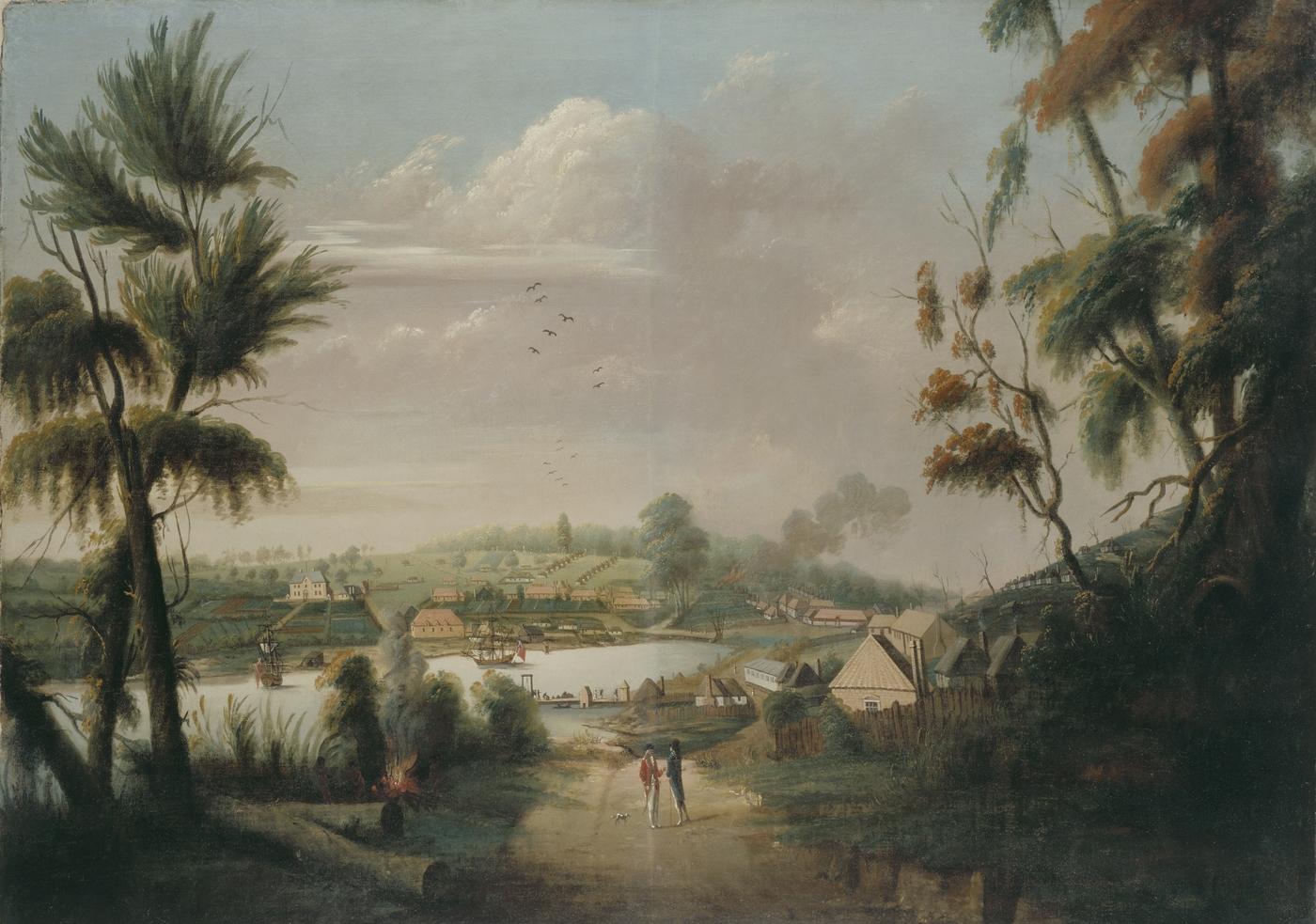
Port Jackson in 1794

The European settlement of Australia began on 26 January 1788 at Port Jackson (modern Sydney, New South Wales), when the First Fleet arrived with more than 1,000 convicts, marines and a few free settlers, plus a vast quantity of stores to establish a penal colony in New South Wales. The United Kingdom claimed all of eastern Australia as its territory on the basis of terra nullius, though the actual landing and consequent settlement was initially confined to the Port Jackson area. According to the first census of 1788, as reported by Governor Phillip to Lord Sydney, the Home Secretary, the white population in the colony was 1,030, of which 753 were convicts and their children; the colony also had 7 horses, 2903 sheep, 749 swine, 6 rabbits, and 754 cattle. The Indigenous population was not counted or estimated, nor reported at that point. More settlers came with the arrival of the Second Fleet in 1789, and the Third Fleet in 1791, with other convict transports in the years that followed.

Governors of New South Wales had authority to make land grants to free settlers, emancipists (former convicts) and non-commissioned officers. Land grants were often subject to conditions, such as a quit rent (one shilling per 50 acres (200,000 m2) to be paid after five years) and a requirement for the grantee to reside on and cultivate the land. Whaling in Australia commenced in 1791, when Captain Thomas Melvill, commanding Britannia, one of 11 ships of the Third Fleet, and Captain Eber Bunker of William and Ann, after landing their passengers and cargo then went whaling and sealing in Australasian waters. Seal skins, Whale oil and baleen (whalebone) were valuable commodities and provided Australia with its first major export industries. Sealing and whaling contributed more to the colonial economy than land produce until the 1830s. When Governor Phillip left the colony in December 1792, the European population was 4,221, of whom 3,099 were convicts.

Hobart in what was then called Van Diemen's Land (modern Tasmania) was established in 1804 as a penal settlement. It was founded more to forestall a possible French claim to that part of Australia than for any immediate economic benefit to the Sydney settlement.

The colony of New South Wales barely survived its first years and was largely neglected for much of the following quarter-century while the British government was preoccupied until 1815 with the Napoleonic Wars. One very important British oversight was the provision of adequate coinage for the new colony and, because of the shortage of any sort of money, the real means of exchange during the first 25 years of settlement was rum. Though it did not solve the problem arising from the lack of coins, but in an attempt to put some order into the economy, in 1800, Governor Philip Gidley King set the value of a variety of foreign coins circulating in New South Wales. During this period the New South Wales Corps, whose officers had benefited most from access to land and imported goods (thus hopelessly entangling public and private interests), defied the authority of the governors. The New South Wales Corps was recalled in 1808.

Governor Macquarie was appointed in the following year. There was a change of policy under his administration towards the promotion of a private economy to support the penal regime, separate from the activities and interests of the colonial government. There was a significant increase in transportation after 1810, which provided cheap and skilled labour for the colony. As laborers, craftsmen, clerks and tradesmen, many convicts possessed the skills required in the new settlements. As their terms expired, they also added permanently to the free population.

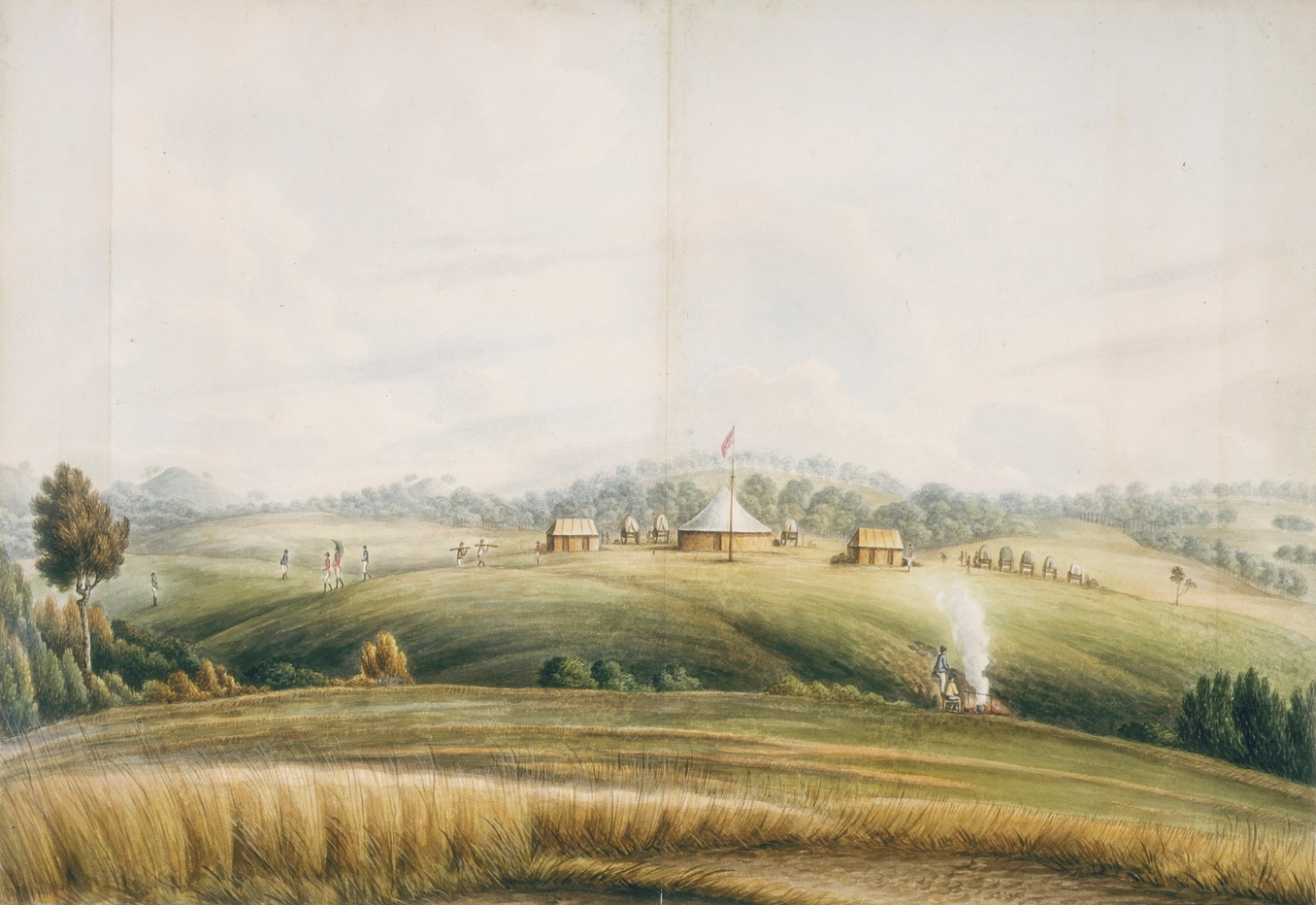
Pastoral lands in Bathurst, 1815.

The Blue Mountains were a barrier to the expansion of the colony. The crossing of the Blue Mountains in 1813 enabled the settlers to access and use the wealthy land west of the mountains for farming. Bathurst was established as Australia's first inland settlement. The first bank in Sydney, the Bank of New South Wales, was established in 1817. The Bank, and each private bank established afterwards, could issue its own paper money. During the 19th and early 20th century, the Bank of New South Wales opened branches, first throughout Australia and Oceania, including branches at Moreton Bay (Brisbane) in 1850, then in Victoria (1851), New Zealand (1861), South Australia (1877), Western Australia (1883), Fiji (1901), Papua (now part of Papua New Guinea) (1910) and Tasmania (1910).

In line with the British government's policy of concentrated land settlement for the colony, Governors of New South Wales tended to be conservative in making land grants. By the end of Macquarie's tenure in 1821, less than 1,000 square miles (3,000 km2) of land had been granted in the colony. Above all, agriculture was established on the basis of land grants to senior officials and emancipated convicts, and limited freedoms were allowed to convicts to supply a range of goods and services. Although economic life depended heavily on the government Commissariat as a supplier of goods, money and foreign exchange, individual rights in property and labour were recognised, and private markets for both started to function.

== 1821–1840s ==
According to a 2018 study in the Economic History Review, "Australian GDP per worker grew exceptionally quickly from the 1820s to the 1870s, at a rate about twice that of the US and three times that of Britain." This rapid growth in GDP per worker did not however lead to rising inequality (as has been the case in similar scenarios in other countries) but rather a "revolutionary levelling in incomes up to the 1870s".

During Governor Brisbane's 4-year term (1821–1825) land grants were more readily made. In addition, regulations introduced during Brisbane's term enabled settlers to purchase (with his permission) up to 4,000 acres (16 km^{2}) at 5s an acre (with superior quality land priced at 7s 6d). During his term, the total amount of land in private hands virtually doubled.

Those known as 'free settlers' were only permitted to take up land within the approved areas, which from 1826 was confined to the Nineteen Counties of the Sydney settlement. From 1831 the granting of free land ceased and the only land that was to be available for sale was to be within the Nineteen Counties. Despite the uncertainty of land tenure, squatters ran large numbers of sheep and cattle beyond the boundaries. From 1836 they could legally do so, paying ten pounds per year for the right.

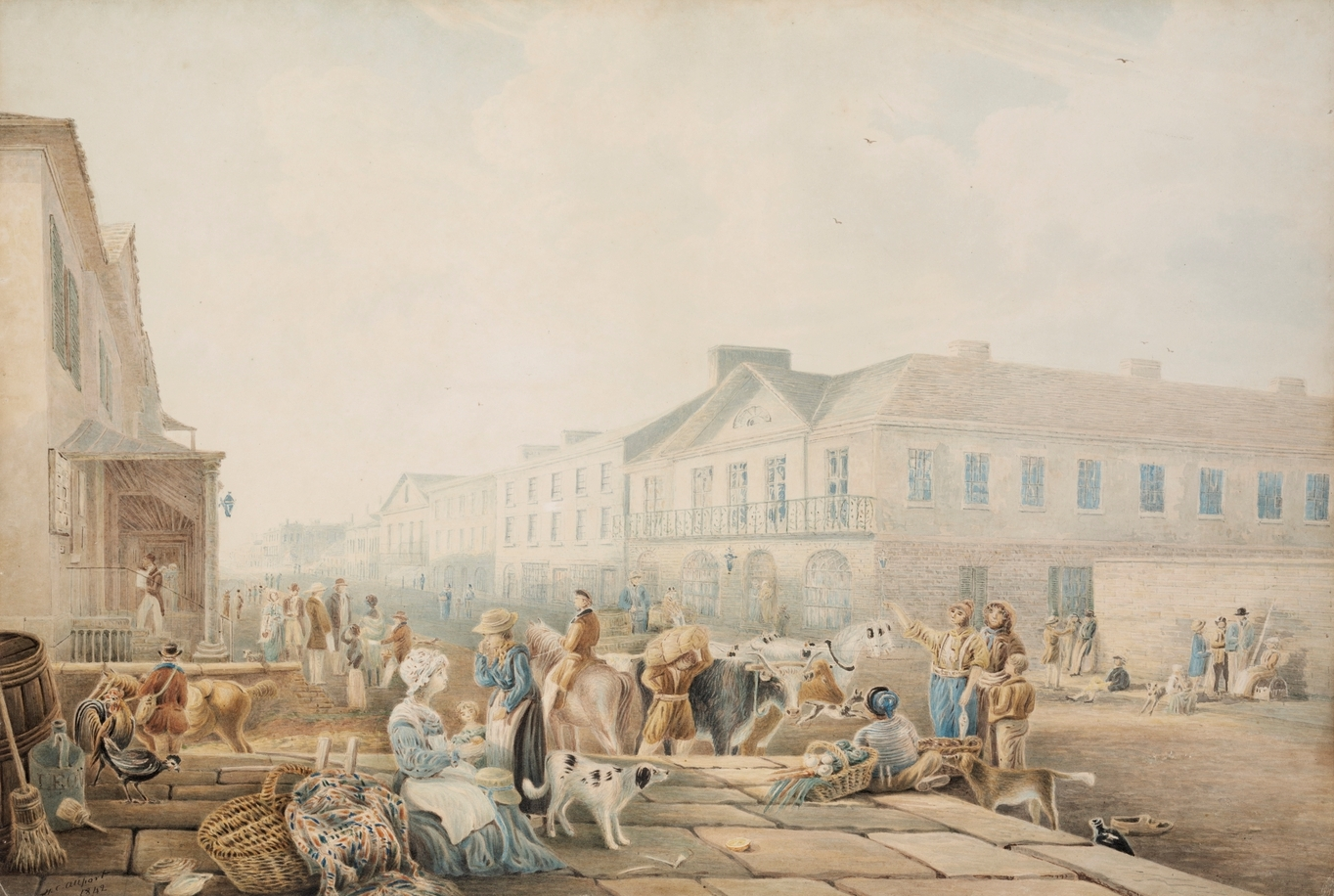
Trade on Sydney's George Street, 1842

From the 1820s economic growth was based increasingly upon the production of fine wool and other rural commodities for markets in Britain and the industrializing economies of Northwestern Europe. To finance this trade a number of banks set up in London in the 1830s, including the Bank of Australasia in 1835 and the Union Bank of Australia established in 1837. This growth was interrupted by two major depressions during the 1840s and 1890s and stimulated in complex ways by the rich gold discoveries in Victoria in 1851, but the underlying dynamics were essentially unchanged.

At different times, the extraction of natural resources, whether maritime before the 1840s or later gold and other minerals, was also important. Agriculture, local manufacturing and construction industries expanded to meet the immediate needs of growing populations, which concentrated increasingly in the main urban centres.

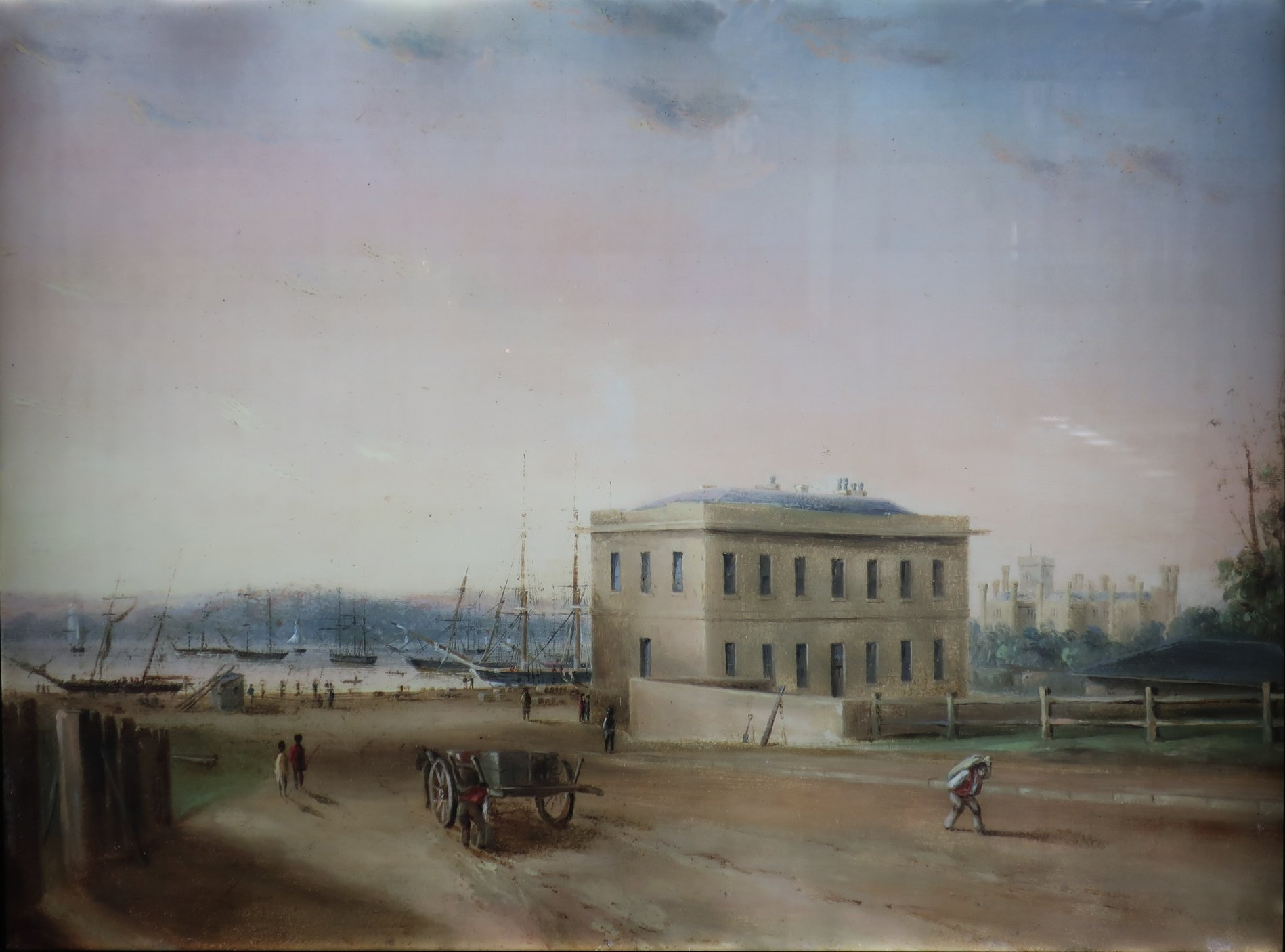
Customs House in the working port of Circular Quay in 1845, the centre of trade and transport in early colonial Australia

The opportunities for large profits in pastoralism and mining attracted considerable amounts of British capital, while expansion generally was supported by enormous government outlays for transport, communication and urban infrastructures, which also depended heavily on British finance. As the economy expanded, large-scale immigration became necessary to satisfy the growing demand for workers, especially after the end of convict transportation to the eastern mainland in 1840.

The costs of immigration were subsidized by colonial governments, with settlers coming predominantly from the United Kingdom and bringing skills that contributed enormously to the economy's growth. All this provided the foundation for the establishment of free colonial societies. In turn, the institutions associated with these – including the rule of law, secure property rights, and stable and democratic political systems – created conditions that, on balance, fostered growth.

In addition to New South Wales, four other British colonies were established on the mainland: Western Australia (1829), South Australia (1836), Victoria (1851) and Queensland (1859). Van Diemen's Land (Tasmania after 1856) became a separate colony in 1825. From the 1850s, these colonies acquired responsible government. In 1901, they federated, creating the Commonwealth of Australia.

The process of colonial growth began with two related developments. First, in 1820, Macquarie responded to land pressure in the districts immediately surrounding Sydney by relaxing restrictions on settlement. Soon the outward movement of herdsmen seeking new pastures became uncontrollable. From the 1820s, the British authorities also encouraged private enterprise by the wholesale assignment of convicts to private employers and easy access to land.

In 1831, the principles of systematic colonization popularized by Edward Gibbon Wakefield (1796–1862) were put into practice in New South Wales with the substitution of land sales for grants in order to finance immigration. This, however, did not affect the continued outward movement of pastoralists who simply occupied land where they could find it beyond the official limits of settlement, usually in disregard for any rights of indigenous peoples.

By 1840, they had claimed a vast swathe of territory two hundred miles in depth running from Moreton Bay in the north (the site of modern Brisbane) to the Port Phillip District (the future colony of Victoria, whose capital Melbourne was marked out in 1837) to Adelaide in South Australia. The absence of any legal title meant that these intruders became known as 'squatters' and the terms of their tenure were not finally settled until 1846 after a prolonged political struggle with the Governor of New South Wales, Sir George Gipps.

The impact of the original penal settlements on the indigenous population had been enormous. The consequences of squatting after 1820 were equally devastating as the land and natural resources upon which indigenous hunter-gathering activities and environmental management depended were appropriated on a massive scale. Aboriginal populations collapsed in the face of disease, violence and forced removal until they survived only on the margins of the new pastoral economy, on government reserves, or in the arid parts of the continent least touched by white settlement. The process would be repeated in northern Australia during the second half of the century.

Colonial governments and settlers did not recognise any Aboriginal land rights or sovereignty (arguable under the doctrine of terra nullius) and therefore felt free to expand into their territory with impunity. The encouragement of private enterprise, the reception of Wakefieldian ideas, and the wholesale spread of white settlement were all part of a profound transformation in official and private perceptions of Australia's prospects and economic value as a British colony. Millennia of fire-stick management to assist hunter-gathering had created inland grasslands in the southeast that were ideally suited to the production of fine wool.

Both the physical environment and the official incentives just described raised expectations of considerable profits to be made in pastoral enterprise and attracted a growing stream of British capital in the form of organizations like the Australian Agricultural Company (1824), which was granted the right to select 1,000,000 acres (4,047 km2) in New South Wales for agricultural development; and new corporate settlements were established in Western Australia (1829) and South Australia (1836). By the 1830s, wool had overtaken whale oil as the colony's most important export, and by 1850 New South Wales had displaced Germany as the main overseas supplier to British industry.

Allowing for the colonial economy's growing complexity, the cycle of growth based upon land settlement, exports and British capital would be repeated twice. The first pastoral boom ended in a depression which was at its worst during 1842–43. Although output continued to grow during the 1840s, the best land had been occupied in the absence of substantial investment in fencing and water supplies. Without further geographical expansion, opportunities for high profits were reduced and the flow of British capital dried up, contributing to a wider downturn caused by drought and mercantile failure.

A number of London-based banks and mortgage companies were established during this period to operate in the colonies, including the Bank of Australasia (1835), the Union Bank of Australia (1837), and the English, Scottish and Australian Bank (1852).

=== 1850–60 ===
The discovery of gold in 1851 led to gold rushes in many parts of Australia and changed the direction of the Australian economy. The discovery led to many workers leaving their employment and heading for the goldfields. The gold rushes caused a huge influx of people from overseas, including from many non-British sources. In the 1850s Victoria was Australia's gold mining centre, its population increasing from 76,000 in 1851 to 540,000 in 1861. Australia's total population more than tripled from 430,000 in 1851 to 1.7 million in 1871. There was a resumption of wool as the principal provider of economic growth by 1860.

The colonial governments started a "development strategy" by issuing bonds to the London market, selling public land and using this to fund infrastructure.

As the easy gold ran out in Victoria many people flooded into Melbourne or became a pool of unemployed in cities around Ballarat and Bendigo. The accelerated population growth and the enormous wealth of the goldfields fuelled a boom which lasted for forty years. Melbourne spread eastwards and northwards over the surrounding flat grasslands, and southwards down the eastern shore of Port Phillip. Wealthy new suburbs grew up, while the working classes settled in the inner suburbs.

The influx of educated gold seekers from England led to rapid growth of schools, churches, learned societies, libraries and art galleries. On the back of the wealth derived from gold, there was a burst in building activity especially in Melbourne. Australia's first telegraph line was erected between Melbourne and Williamstown in 1853. The first railway in Australia was built in Melbourne in 1854. Following incorporation in 1853, the University of Melbourne was built in 1855, and the State Library of Victoria in 1856. There were many other building works.

=== 1860–75 ===
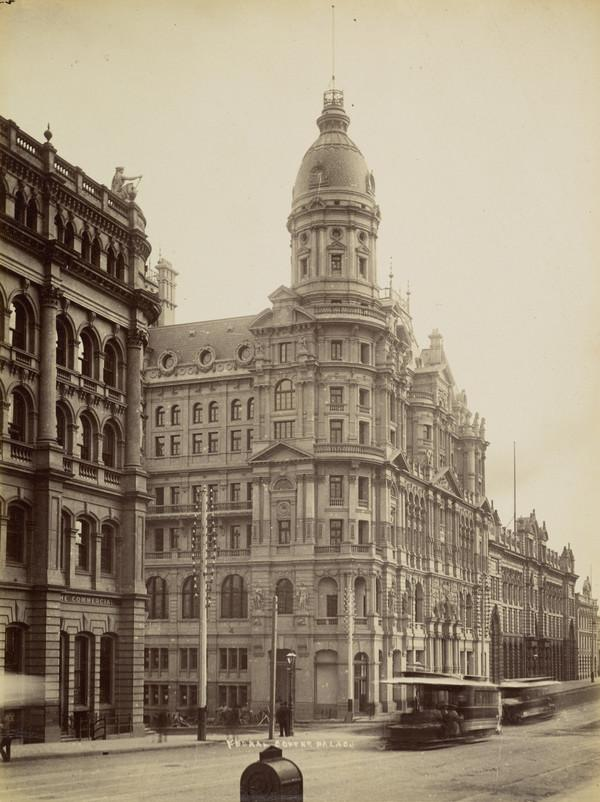
Melbourne's Federal Coffee Palace. A boom period in the 1870s due to the discovery of gold led to the construction of many grand edifices and public buildings in the city.

Due to the increases in income attributable to the gold rush, manufacturing and construction sectors of the economy fared very well. The boom fuelled by gold and wool lasted through the 1860s and the 1870s. Victoria suffered from an acute labour shortage despite its steady influx of migrants, and this pushed up wages until they were the highest in the world. Victoria was known as "the working man's paradise" in these years. The Stonemasons Union won the eight-hour day in 1856 and celebrated by building the enormous Melbourne Trades Hall in Carlton.

Australia's first stock exchange was opened in Melbourne in 1861.

In 1861, the Crown Lands Acts 1861 (NSW) reformed land holdings in New South Wales in an attempt to break the squatters' domination of land tenure. The Acts allowed unlimited selection of agricultural crown land in designated areas and made redundant the limits of location, which had limited sale of land to the Nineteen Counties which had applied since 1826.

=== 1875–80 ===
As fertile land became less available to settlers, pastoral industries continued to increase their land holdings for the use of wool production. This caused a retraction in returns on investment by pastoral companies. Even when poorer land was utilized for the purpose of wool production there was continued investment both from private backers, and governments (in the form of transportation infrastructure).

Melbourne Trades Hall was opened in 1859 with Trades and Labour Councils and Trades Halls opening in all cities and most regional towns in the following forty years. During the 1880s Trade unions developed among shearers, miners, and stevedores (wharf workers), but soon spread to cover almost all blue-collar jobs. Shortages of labour led to high wages for a prosperous skilled working class, whose unions demanded and got an eight-hour day and other benefits unheard of in Europe.

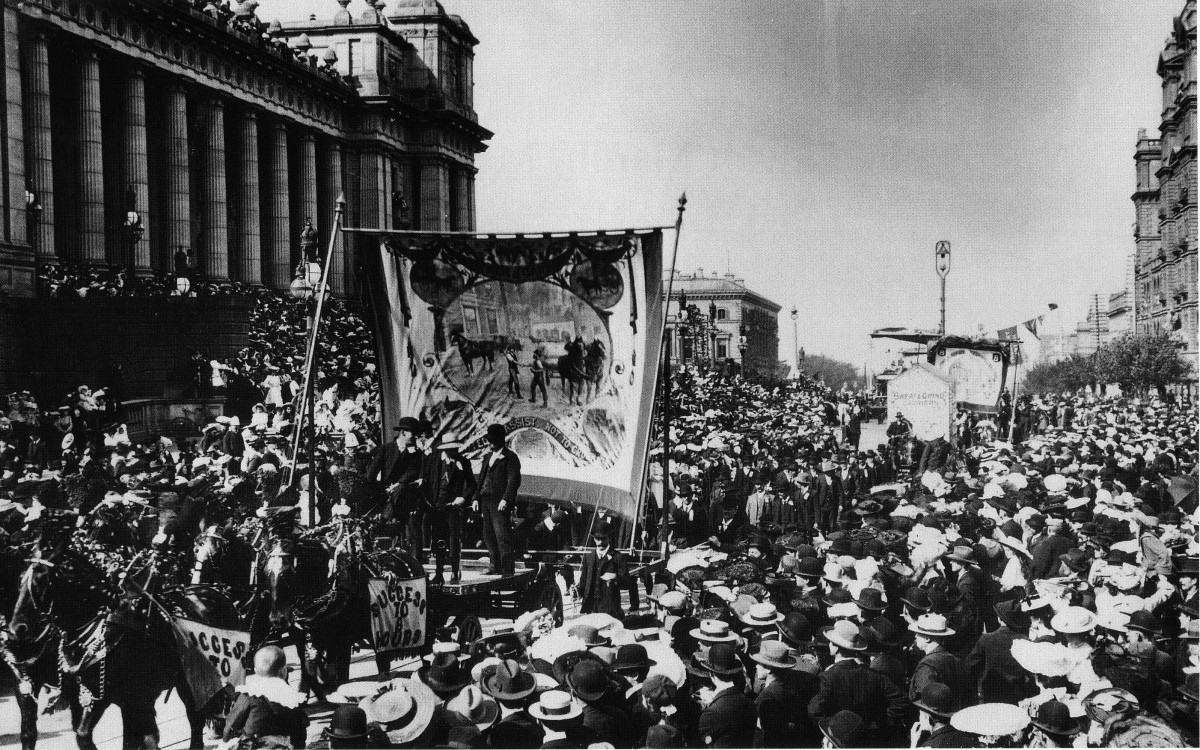
Eight-hour day march c. 1900, outside Parliament House in Spring Street, Melbourne

Australia gained a reputation as "the working man's paradise". Some employers tried to undercut the unions by importing Chinese labour. This produced a reaction which led to all the colonies restricting Chinese and other Asian immigration. This was the foundation of the White Australia Policy. The "Australian compact", based around centralised industrial arbitration, a degree of government assistance particularly for primary industries, and White Australia, was to continue for many years before gradually dissolving in the second half of the 20th century.

== 1880–1890 ==
An investment boom in Australia in the 1880s saw increased economic expansion although the investments were providing less of a return. That can be attributed to foreign funds' becoming more available to Australia. The influx of capital led to Australians' experiencing the highest per capita incomes in the world during the late 19th century.

However, by the end of the 1880s, overseas investors became more concerned with the difference between expected returns and actual returns on Australian investment. The Barings Crisis of 1890, although focused on Argentina, led to a reassessment of the exposure of investors to regions of declining return, and consequently British investors began to withdraw from providing further funding to the Australian market. This caused a banking crisis in Victoria, South Australia, New South Wales and Tasmania. In 1891, The Bank of Van Diemen's Land was the first major bank to fail, with 13 more to follow. By the end of the year it is estimated that half of Australian bank customers had been debarred from their bank. Consequently, the eastern Australian colonies saw the start of a severe depression in 1890–91. Australian economic historian Noel Butlin would later argue that the history of Australian settlement has been one of growth financed by foreign capital, punctuated by depression caused by balance of payment crises after a collapse in property prices and exacerbated by the imprudent use of capital.

The impact of the end of the long boom and the collapse of the property market in Melbourne did not impact as greatly the economy of the colony of Western Australia, where substantial reserves of gold were discovered at Kalgoorlie and Coolgardie in a region of Western Australia that subsequently became known as the 'Goldfields'. This prompted a 'Gold Rush' in Western Australia characterized by a sustained, rapid expansion of the colony that would continue up to the First World War. This expansion allowed the development of the port of Fremantle, the opening up of the south-west corner of the colony for agricultural development and the rapid expansion of the colonial rail network.

In the 1880s, the long boom culminated in a frenzy of speculation and rapid inflation of land prices known as the Land Boom and centred on the city of Melbourne. Governments shared in the wealth and ploughed money into urban infrastructure, particularly railways. Huge fortunes were built on speculation, and Victorian business and politics became notorious for corruption. English banks lent freely to colonial speculators, adding to the mountain of debt on which the boom was built. Following the collapse of the Land Boom, property values in central Melbourne would not return to the level of the 1880s until the late 1950s (in real terms).

== 1890–1900 ==
- 1890: the Great maritime strike
- 1891: the Australian shearers' strike
- 1891: 16 small banks and building societies collapsed in Melbourne
- 1892: the Broken Hill miners' strike
- 1892: 133 limited companies went into liquidation in Victoria alone
- 1893: a major international depression and the speculative property boom of the 1880s, led to the Australian banking crisis of 1893 and a serious economic depression. 11 commercial banks failed or temporarily closed to avoid a run, including the National Bank of Australasia and the Commercial Bank of Australia. On 1 May, the Victoria government implemented a five-day bank holiday to ameliorate the panic.
- 1894: recovery from the crisis began. Some reforms to regulations and laws were made to try to prevent future financial abuses.

== 1900–1939 ==
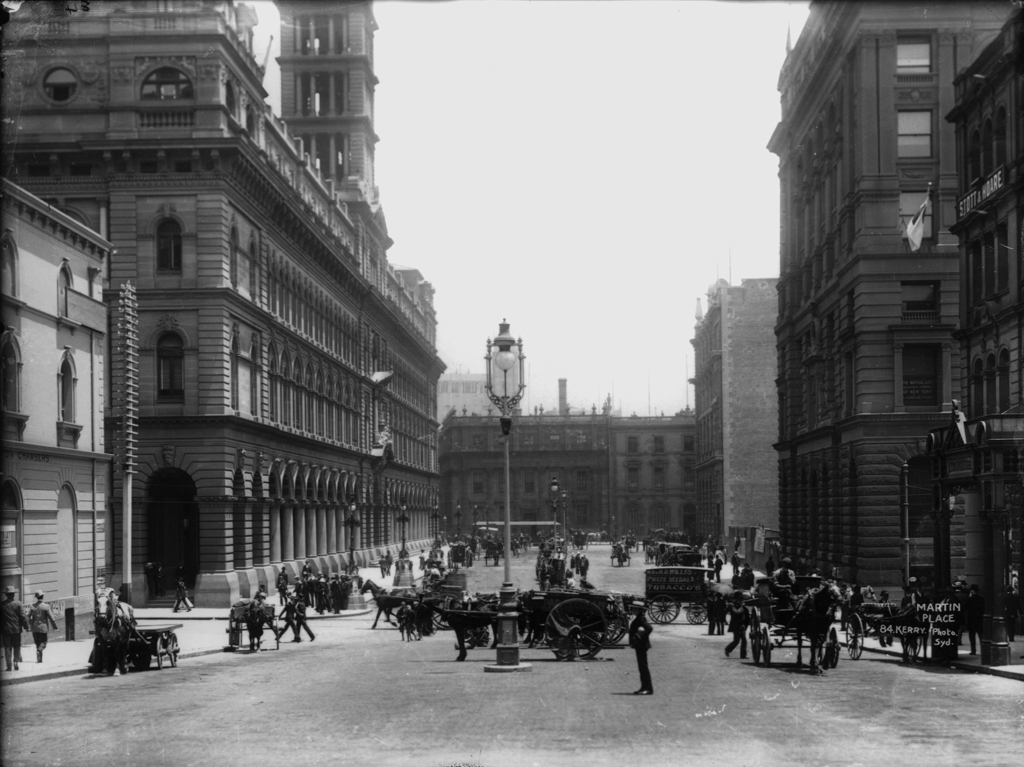
Martin Place in 1900. Sydney emerged as the largest economy in the country in the early 20th century

In 1901, the first federal government formed by the Protectionist Party. In 1904, the Australian Labor Party forms the Commonwealth government, the first labour movement in the world to attain government.

- In 1907, the Harvester case ruling that established the right to a basic wage, a 'fair and reasonable' minimum wage for unskilled workers of 7 shillings.

In 1910, the federal government introduced a national currency, the Australian pound. Monetary policy ensured that the Australian pound was fixed in value to the pound sterling, and as long as Britain was on the gold standard, so was Australia. In 1914, the pound sterling was removed from the gold standard, but when it was returned to the gold standard in 1925, the sudden increase in its value, imposed by the nominal gold price, unleashed crushing deflation. Both the initial 1914 inflation and the subsequent 1926 deflation had far-reaching economic effects throughout the British Empire, including Australia, and the rest of the world. In 1929, as an emergency measure during the Great Depression, Australia left the gold standard, resulting in a devaluation relative to sterling. A variety of pegs to sterling applied until December 1931, when the government set a rate of £1 Australian = 16 shillings sterling (£1·5s Australian = £1 sterling; A£1.25 = £1 sterling).

While wool-growing remained at the centre of economic activity, a variety of new goods, such as wheat, dairy and other agriculturally-based produce, became part of Australian exports. It was in then that the latter started contributing more to economic growth than wool production. Part of that emergence of other sources of economic expansion came from technological progress, such as disease-resistant wheat and refrigerated shipping. The development of these technologies also renewed large-scale foreign investment.

That injection of foreign investment led to increases in construction, particularly in the private residential sector. That injection of foreign cash was the main contributor to economic expansion, which was again troublesome for Australia's economy. Returns on investments, as before, were immensely different from the expected returns.

=== 1930s ===
By the 1920s, agricultural producers were experiencing profit troubles and governments, which invested heavily on transportation infrastructure, were not getting the returns that they had expected. Cutbacks in borrowing, government and private expenditure in the late 1920s led to a recession. The recession itself became worse as other nations fell into depressions. They not only cut back on foreign investments to Australia but also led to a lower demand for Australian exports. That culminated into the biggest recession in Australia's history, which peaked in 1931–1932.

The worldwide depression of the 1930s was not felt as badly in Australia than in to international counterparts because of increases in productivity from the manufacturing sector. (In William Sinclair 's terms , that is when Australia moved from the old model to the new model.) Trade protection, particularly from tariffs implemented by governments at the time, were instrumental to the prosperity of the manufacturing sector.

A major labour strike took place at the State Coalfields in Wonthaggi, Victoria in 1934. Conditions were hard on the strikers over a five-month episode. Their resilience, cohesion, and significant community support accounted for their persistence. Winning the strike revitalized the Victorian labour movement and enhanced its political power.

== 1939–1945 ==
World War II had a profound impact on the Australian economy and permanently changed how the economy was run. Prior to 1939, the Commonwealth Government had little role in the management of the Australian economy. The state governments levied most of the income tax, and Australia's international trade was dictated by its relationship with the British Empire. The Japanese attack on Australia in 1942 led the Australian Government to adopt an "All In" war policy, which dictated the full mobilisation of the Australian economy and workforce. To that end, a range of economic and industrial controls were adopted: rationing, production controls, military and industrial conscription. The new powers were generally administered by the Commonwealth Government assisted by government appointed boards of control. The best and the most successful example was the Commonwealth Munitions Board (CMB) which directed the expansion of the Australian munitions industry. Chaired by Essington Lewis, the General Manager of BHP, the CMB was by the end of the war indirectly managing some of the largest manufacturing concerns in the country.

The economic policies of the Labor government of John Curtin greatly stimulated the economy by increasing production and ending unemployment. Labor relations were good and strikes were avoided. A wide range of industries, including motor vehicles, metal processing, TCF (textiles, clothing and footwear) and chemicals, all benefitted from government contracts and regulations, but by 1943, a severe manpower shortage limited further industrial expansion. High profits, and the strict rationing of consumables led to a rapid increase in national savings and profits, which generated a surplus of domestic capital. To fund the war effort, in 1942, the Australian Government instituted the Uniform Taxation Act and removed the ability of the state governments to levy income tax. Higher taxation and successive bond drives meant that by 1945, the Australian Government had largely funded the war effort from domestic sources. In the immediate postwar period, Australia was able even to extend economic assistance to Britain, and the Curtin government could start planning for a comprehensive plan of postwar reconstruction.

== 1945-1972 ==
Wartime measures and the expanded wartime economy provided the basis for rapid economic growth in the period after 1945. Postwar economic reconstruction was also aided by a policy of national development pursued by the Australian Labor Party (ALP), which formed the government from 1941 to 1949. That policy was in line with the general socialist ideals that the ALP held and were then widely supported within the broader labour movement.

International conditions also favoured the policy as after the war Australia enjoyed favourable terms of trade and an increase in the amount of foreign (largely US) investment into the economy. However, it was assumed that the agricultural and mining sectors would be geared towards international markets, and manufacturing would serve the domestic "consumer" market. This continued into the 1950s and 1960s, and led government policy makers to implement import replacement strategies.

During the war, Australia's international trade and investment position began to change. In 1944, Australia became a part of the Bretton Woods system, with major world currencies maintaining fixed exchange rates relative to each other and with the US dollar being pegged to gold. Australia maintained a fixed exchange rate which was effectively pegged to sterling until 1967. The exchange rate between the Australian and British pounds was set at 0.8 GBP (16 shillings sterling; A£1 5s = £1 sterling). However, those new developments did not entirely supplant the traditional relationship with Britain, and Australia remained a part of the "Sterling Zone" until 1967. That reflected Australia's historical ties as well as a view about the stability in value of the British pound. After a brief period of disruption caused by the Second World War, the United Kingdom returned to its position as Australia's main trading partner.

In 1949, the United Kingdom devalued the pound sterling against the US dollar by 30%, and Australia followed suit so that the Australian pound would not become overvalued in sterling zone countries with which Australia did most of its external trade. As the pound sterling went from US$4.03 to US$2.80, the Australian pound went from US$3.224 to US$2.24. Relative to the pound sterling, the Australian pound remained the same at A£1 5s = £1 sterling.

With the breakdown of the Bretton Woods system in 1971, Australia converted the traditional peg to a fluctuating rate against the US dollar. In September 1974, Australia valued the dollar against a basket of currencies called the trade weighted index (TWI) in an effort to reduce the fluctuations associated with its tie to the US dollar. The daily TWI valuation was changed in November 1976 to a periodically adjusted valuation. On 12 December 1983, Australia floated the Australian dollar, with the exchange rate reflecting the balance of payments and other market drivers.

Immediately after 1945 Australia continued to be governed by the ALP, which adopted a policy of reconstruction based on the principles of "nationalisation and rationalisation". This dictated that the government maintain control over the "commanding heights" of the economy in order to continue economic growth, restrain inflation and institute full employment. A number of Australian companies such as QANTAS were nationalised in this period, while a range of government run enterprises such as TAA and the ANL were set up to expand the government sector. In 1948 the Snowy Mountain River Project was commenced. This policy achieved high economic growth, but led to growing political opposition, especially after the failure of the government to nationalise the banking sector in 1948. Political opponents also capitalized on the retention of rationing of food and petrol. As a result, in 1949 the government was replaced at national elections with a more conservative government committed to supporting a "mixed economy".

The new Australian Government, led by Liberal leader Robert Menzies, continued to regulate economic activity, but preferred to manage the economy "indirectly" where possible. More encouragement was given to private industry, but where public enterprise was deemed "necessary" it was retained, and in some cases expanded. The pragmatic approach of the conservative Menzies Government was underlined with the establishment of the Reserve Bank of Australia, the continuance of the mass immigration policy began in 1946, and the signing of a range of new trade agreements with nations outside the British Empire, including West Germany (1955), Japan (1957) and the USSR (1965). In 1955 Australia began exporting coal to Japan, and by 1967 Japan had surpassed Britain as Australia's main market. In 1966 Australia abandoned the pound, shilling, and pence and adopted the Australian dollars and cents..

Economic growth, high employment levels, growing foreign investment and the development of new markets led Australia to enjoy a high level of economic prosperity in the post-war period. Rationing was abolished in 1950. High population growth, high government spending, the introduction of television (1956) and the gradual relaxation of government controls over "hire purchase" helped Australia to develop into an affluent society in the 1950s and 1960s. Rising income from taxation receipts eventually allowing the Australian Government to fund a large expansion in higher education, the development of Canberra, the national capital, and the host the 1956 Melbourne Olympics. By the time of Sir Robert Menzies's retirement in 1966, the Australian economy seemed stronger and wealthier than ever before. The Australian governments of this period, dominated by the conservative Liberal Party of Australia, were broadly successful in maintaining economic growth and unemployment, but were criticised by opponents for failing to effectively control inflation, instituting periodic "credit squeezes" (1952 and 1961), and rejecting national economic planning. During the 1960s an increase in tariff protection for new industries protected jobs and profits, but lowered the need for productivity and innovation, and by 1966 foreign investment was shifting to the less heavily regulated mining and pastoral sectors.

After 1967 the favourable conditions that Australia had enjoyed in the international economy began to change. From 1962 Britain progressively abandoned the system of Imperial Preference adopted in 1932 and moved towards membership of the European Economic Community. Australia's privileged access to the British market was drawing to a close. In the era of the Vietnam War the U.S. Economy began to enter into a difficult period, and the rate of U.S. investment into Australia began to decline. Even more ominously, Australia began to face greater economic competition and a steady decline in her terms of trade. In this context the governments that followed the Menzies government in the period 1966–1972 increasingly found it hard to manage the rising expectations of consumers and industry. In the period 1972–1973 Australia began to experience the beginnings of "stagflation" as unemployment and inflation began to rise simultaneously for the first time.

== 1972–1982 ==
The post-war economic boom ended with "stagflation" in the early 1970s. This was primarily caused by developments in the international economy; the Oil Crisis, Britain's entry into the E.E.C., and growing economic competition in Australia's traditional export markets. However, the economic policies of the ALP Whitlam government did not prove effective at dealing with stagflation. Gough Whitlam had been elected on a platform that included the rapid expansion of government funded health and education programs. At the same time the labour movement, of which the Labor Party was a part, were opposed to both wage restraint and economic restructuring. Higher government spending coupled with higher wages, but not linked to higher productivity, created strong inflationary pressure. Whitlam's lack of a majority in the Australian Senate, and the hostility of the conservative state governments made it difficult to effectively manage the economy.

In 1973, with Australia experiencing sharply rising inflation, Fred Gruen, special consultant to the Whitlam government, proposed a 25% across the board tariff cut, which was adopted by the government. The 1973 oil crisis had caused prices to spike and, according to government figures, inflation topped 13% for the year 1973–1974. By mid-1974, Australia was in an economic recession. The rapid change in economic conditions was not countered by a change in government policy. In particular Whitlam's desire to increase the wages and conditions of the federal public service was not checked. This fed into a 30% increase in imports and a $1.5 billion increase in the trade deficit by the end of 1974. Primary producers of commodities such as beef were caught in a credit squeeze as short-term interest rates rose to extremely high levels. Unemployment also rose significantly despite continuing government spending.

The failure of the Whitlam government to effectively manage the Australian economy was a factor in the crisis that ended that government's term in office at the end of 1975. The government of Malcolm Fraser that succeeded Whitlam promised greater control of government spending, and an end to inflationary pay increases in the public sector. However, its close links with industry and commerce made it reluctant to institute economic reform. While a growing number of economists and business leaders began to call for economic deregulation the Fraser government preferred to promote policies similar to those adopted in the earlier post-war period; chiefly wage and credit restraint, and tighter government economic regulation of the economy. This was symbolised in 1982 when Fraser dismissed the findings of the Campbell Commission into Banking (which his government had put in place) that had recommended deregulation of the banking industry.

== 1983–2020; 2020–present ==
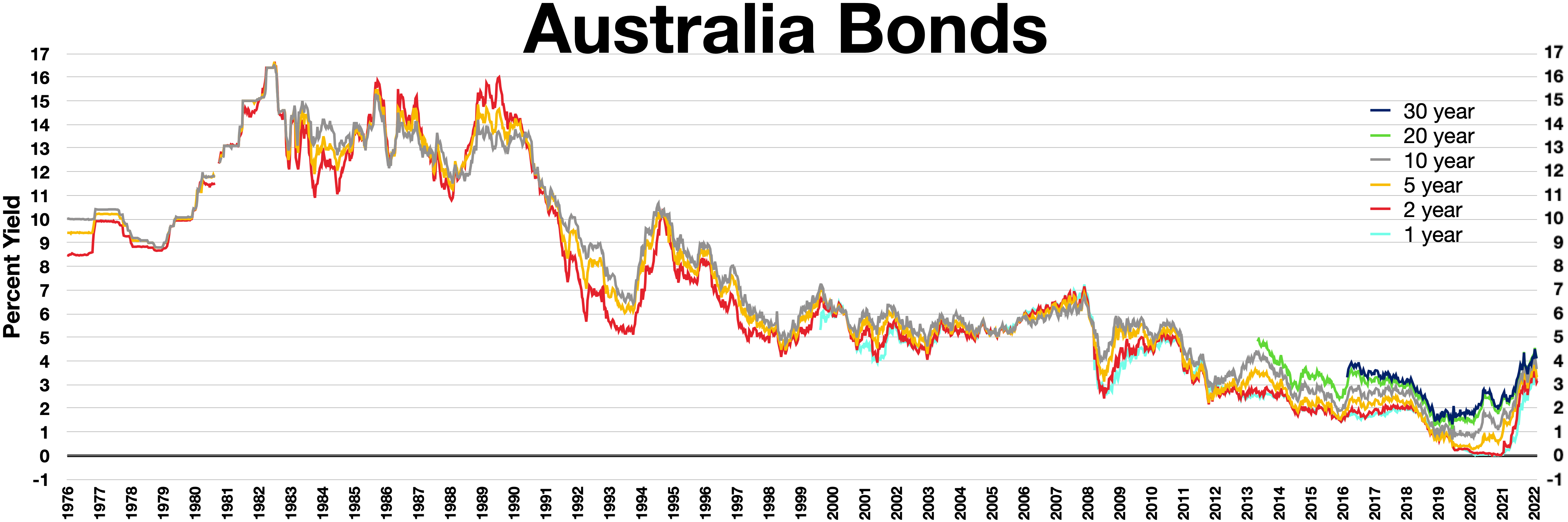
Australia bonds 30 year 20 year 10 year 5 year 2 year 1 year

Despite similarities in history, law and culture, Australia and Canada followed quite different macroeconomic histories. Australia's GDP per capita was well above those of Britain and the United States in 1870, and more than twice the Canadian level. By the 1980s, however, Canada's GDP per capita almost matched the United States, and was well above that of Australia and Britain. Economic liberalisation and deregulation of the Australian economy began in the early 1980s under the Hawke Labor government, which commenced the process of economic reform by concluding a wages accord with the trade union movement. In exchange for wage restraint and an increase in the "social wage" the trade union movement agreed to support economic reform and oppose industrial conflict (i.e. strikes). The success of the "Accord" allowed a Labor government to implement economic reforms that in other nations had been implemented by conservative political parties; tariffs were progressively cut, the Australian dollar was floated (1983), and the financial system deregulated. Hawke was also able to privatise several large government enterprises. Sector wide 'Industry Plans' for economic reform were introduced in telecommunications and manufacturing. The Commonwealth Bank was sold in three parcels between 1991 and 1996. Qantas was sold in two parcels, one in 1993 and the other in 1995, and the Commonwealth Serum Laboratories was floated in 1994. Telstra was sold off in three parcels in 1997, 1999 and 2006. One result of these reforms was a marked increase labour productivity, and a reduction in government spending as a proportion of GDP. The Australian Stock Exchange Limited (ASX) was formed in 1987 through the amalgamation of six independent stock exchanges that formerly operated in the state capitals. Each of those exchanges had a history of share trading dating back to the 19th century.

The global early 1990s recession came swiftly after the Black Monday of October 1987, resulting from a stock collapse of unprecedented size which saw the Dow Jones Industrial Average fall by 22.6%. This collapse, larger than the stock market crash of 1929, was handled effectively by the global economy, and the stock market began to quickly recover. However, in North America, the lumbering savings and loans industry was facing decline which eventually led to a savings and loan crisis which compromised the wellbeing of millions of Americans. The following recession thus impacted the many countries closely linked to the United States, including Australia. Paul Keating, who was Treasurer at the time, famously referred to it as "the recession that Australia had to have". During the recession, GDP fell by 1.7%, employment by 3.4% and the unemployment rate rose to 10.8%. However, as is typical during recessions, there was a beneficial reduction in inflation.

This process of economic reform and restructuring continued under the Coalition government led by John Howard which took power in 1996. The Howard government established a goods and services tax from 2000, established a national Productivity Commission and further deregulated labour markets under WorkChoices in 2006.

WorkChoices, in effect, took away an employee's right to sue for unfair dismissal if their former employer employed less than 100 people, making its implementation extremely unpopular, greatly contributing to the Howard government's loss at the 2007 election. The newly elected Labor government, under Kevin Rudd, completely repealed WorkChoices in 2008, passing the Fair Work Act 2009.

These economic reforms have resulted in Australia now being considered one of the most open economies in the world, notwithstanding polarising opinions regarding the long-term success of free and open trade, and its inevitable effect on domestic workers. Australia has enjoyed over two decades of economic growth, coupled with low inflation and relatively low unemployment - until 2020 when the country entered into a brief recession where unemployment skyrocketed amid the global COVID-19 pandemic. Due to the outbreak of COVID-19, trade disputes with China, and the Russian invasion of Ukraine, there has been a significant political shift in focus toward National Security and renewed interest in Australia's manufacturing industry. Although free trade continues to take place, the importance of a thriving local industry has regained traction as an important consensus. The economic reforms implemented since the 1980s have led to a large contraction of the Australian manufacturing sector, along with trade union membership; with the percentage of workforce unionisation dropping from over 50% in the 1970s, to only 14% presently.

The 1980s economic reforms, intended to diversify the national economy and make it more resilient, were introduced after the mid-1980s decline in the terms of trade. The trend of Australia's gross domestic product at market prices estimated by the International Monetary Fund is as follows:

Year	Gross domestic product - A$m	US$ exchange US1 = A$	Inflation index (2000=100)
1980	140,987	A$0.87	36
1985	245,596	A$1.42	54
1990	407,307	A$1.27	80
1995	500,458	A$1.34	90
2000	669,779	A$1.71	100
2005	926,880	A$1.30	116
2007	1,044,162	A$1.26	122

For purchasing power parity comparisons, the US$ is exchanged at A$0.98. In recent times Australia has received financial growth in the mining industry. This has been a major contributing factor of a high Australian dollar. The reform of the Australian economy in this period was not without cost. Improvements in the efficiency of the services sector, agriculture and mining were achieved while manufacturing industries struggled, especially those industries that had been established behind a wall of high tariffs created in the post-war period.

=== Automobiles ===
In 2008, four companies mass-produced cars in Australia. Mitsubishi ceased production in March 2008, followed by Ford in 2016, and Holden and Toyota in 2017.

Holden announced on 11 December 2013 that Holden cars would no longer be manufactured in Australia from the end of 2017.

Ford had two main factories, both in Victoria: located in the Geelong suburb of Norlane and the northern Melbourne suburb of Broadmeadows. Both plants were closed down in October 2016.

Until 2006, Toyota had factories in Port Melbourne and Altona, Victoria. Since then, all manufacturing has been at Altona. In 2008, Toyota exported 101,668 vehicles worth $1,900 million. In 2011 the figures were "59,949 units worth $1,004 million". On 10 February 2014 it was announced that by the end of 2017 Toyota would cease manufacturing vehicles and engines in Australia. Whilst we've seen the closure of Holden, Ford and Toyota there has been an increase in Australia's Electric Vehicle potential with the introduction of ACE EV and Australian electric vehicle company.

=== Textiles ===
Total employment in Australian textile, clothing and footwear manufacturing (thousands of people) since 1984

Until trade liberalisation in the mid-1980s, Australia had a large textile industry. This decline continued through the first decade of the 21st century. Since the 1980s, tariffs have steadily been reduced; in early 2010, the tariffs were reduced from 17.5 to 10 percent on clothing, and 7.5–10% to 5% for footwear and other textiles. As of 2010, most textile manufacturing, even by Australian companies, is performed in Asia.

=== Mining ===
The economic rise of China has produced a major demand for mining products, especially iron ore and coal.

==== Iron ====
Geoscience Australia calculates that the country's "economic demonstrated resources" of iron currently amount to 24 gigatonnes, or 24 billion tonnes. The current production rate from the Pilbara region of Western Australia is approximately 430 million tonnes a year and rising. Gavin Mudd (Monash University) and Jonathon Law (CSIRO) expect it to be gone within 30–50 years and 56 years, respectively. These 2010 estimates require on-going review to take into account shifting demand for lower-grade iron ore and improving mining and recovery techniques (allowing deeper mining below the groundwater table).

Tensions remain high between management and labour unions.

==== Coal ====
In 1984 Australia surpassed the US as the world's largest coal exporter. One-third of Australia's coal exports were shipped from the Hunter Valley region of New South Wales, where coal mining and transport had begun nearly two centuries earlier. Coal River was the first name given by British settlers to the Hunter River after coal was found there in 1795. In 1804 the Sydney-based administration established a permanent convict settlement near the mouth of the Hunter River to mine and load the coal, predetermining the town's future as a coal port by naming it Newcastle. Today, Newcastle, NSW, is the largest coal port in the world. Now the state of Queensland is Australia's top coal producer, with its Bowen Basin the main source of black coal, and plans by miners such as Gina Rinehart to open up the Galilee and Surat Basins to coal mining. China became the main customer.

=== 2020 recession ===
The COVID-19 pandemic reached Australia in January 2020. On 20 March, Australian borders were closed to all non-residents, impacting especially tourism and the entry of overseas students. Social distancing rules were imposed on 21 March, and “non-essential” services were closed, which included social gathering venues such as pubs and clubs but, unlike many other countries, did not include most business operations such as construction, manufacturing and many retail categories. A second wave of infections in Victoria emerged during May to June, and Victoria imposed a strict lockdown, which continued into September. State governments also imposed bans on cross state border movements.

On 2 September 2020, as a result of the COVID-19 pandemic, Australia officially went into recession (defined as two quarters of negative growth) with GDP falling 7% in the June 2020 quarter, the largest drop on record. GDP fell 0.3% in the March quarter.

== Trade unions ==
The Australian labour movement generally sought to end child labour practices, improve worker safety, increase wages for both union workers and non-union workers, raise the entire society's standard of living, reduce the hours in a work week, provide public education for children, and bring other benefits to working class families.

Melbourne Trades Hall was opened in 1859 with Trades and Labour Councils and Trades Halls opening in all cities and most regional towns in the next forty years. During the 1880s Trade unions developed among shearers, miners, and stevedores (wharf workers), but soon spread to cover almost all blue-collar jobs. Shortages of labour led to high wages for a prosperous skilled working class, whose unions demanded and got an eight-hour day and other benefits unheard of in Europe.

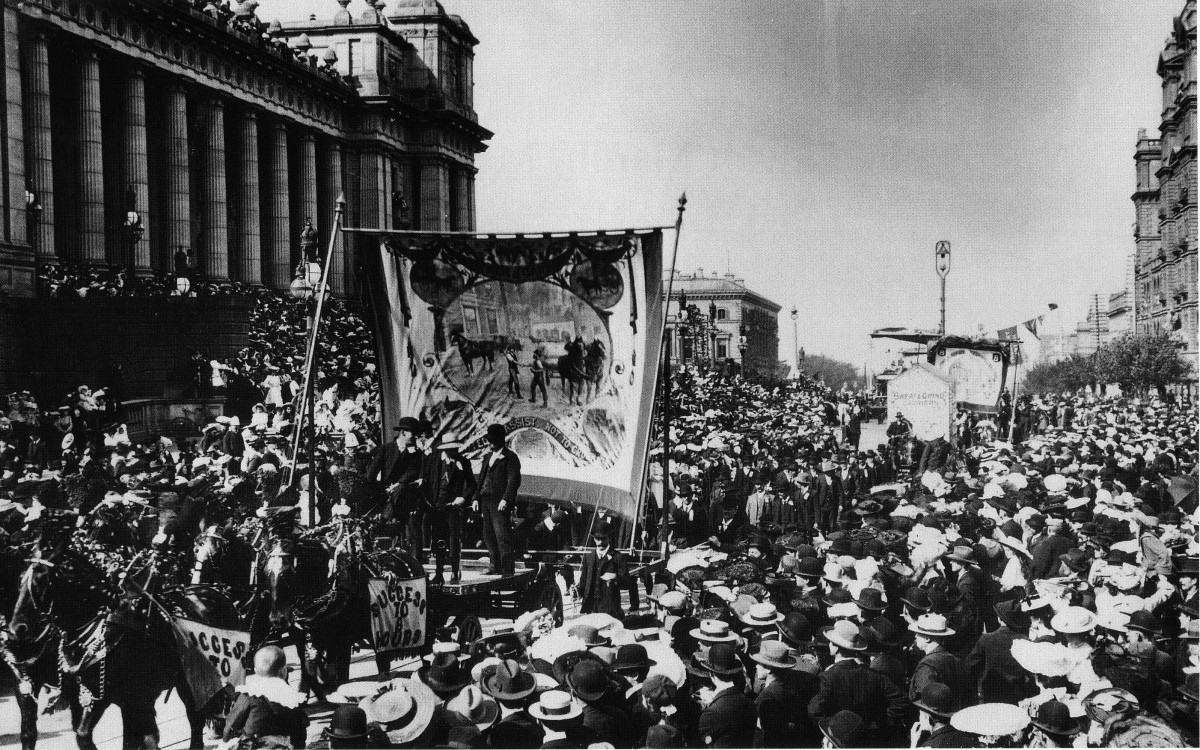
Eight-hour day march c. 1900, outside Parliament House in Spring Street, Melbourne

Australia gained a reputation as "the working man's paradise". Some employers tried to undercut the unions by importing Chinese labour. This produced a reaction which led to all the colonies restricting Chinese and other Asian immigration. This was the foundation of the White Australia Policy. The "Australian compact", based around centralised industrial arbitration, a degree of government assistance particularly for primary industries, and White Australia, was to continue for many years before gradually dissolving in the second half of the 20th century.

In the 1870s and 1880s, the growing trade union movement began a series of protests against foreign labour. Their arguments were that Asians and Chinese took jobs away from white men, worked for "substandard" wages, lowered working conditions and refused unionisation.

Objections to these arguments came largely from wealthy land owners in rural areas. It was argued that without Asiatics to work in the tropical areas of the Northern Territory and Queensland, the area would have to be abandoned. Despite these objections to restricting immigration, between 1875 and 1888 all Australian colonies enacted legislation which excluded all further Chinese immigration. Asian immigrants already residing in the Australian colonies were not expelled and retained the same rights as their Anglo and Southern compatriots.

The Barton government which came to power after the first elections to the Commonwealth parliament in 1901 was formed by the Protectionist Party with the support of the Australian Labor Party. The support of the Labor Party was contingent upon restricting non-white immigration, reflecting the attitudes of the Australian Workers Union and other labour organisations at the time, upon whose support the Labor Party was founded.

== See also ==
- Agriculture in Australia
- Economy of Australia
- Banking in Australia
- History of tariffs in Australia
- Transport in Australia

== Sources and further reading ==
- Beaumont, Joan. Australia's Great Depression : How a Nation Shattered by the Great War Survived the Worst Economic Crisis It Has Ever Faced (Allen & Unwin, Sydney, 2022)
- Boehm, E. S. Twentieth century economic development in Australia (1971) online
- Bramble, Tom. Trade Unionism in Australia: A history from flood to ebb tide (Cambridge University Press, 2008). excerpt; also see complete text online
- Butlin, N. G. (1964). Investment in Australian Economic Development. Cambridge University Press.
- Butlin, N.G. Forming a Colonial Economy: Australia 1810-1850 (1995)
- Butlin, N.G. War Economy 1939-1942 (1961)
- Chapman, Bruce, ed. Australian Economic Growth: Essays in Honour of Fred H. Gruen (1989)
- Coghlan, T A (1918). Labour and Industry in Australia, Cambridge Books, Cambridge.
- Downes, Peter, Kevin Hanslow, and Peter Tulip. "The Effect of the Mining Boom on the Australian Economy." (Reserve Bank of Australia Research Discussion Papers, December 2014). on 21st century. online
- Fitzpatrick, B (1939). British Imperialism and Australia: 1783–1833, Sydney University Press, Sydney.
- Fitzpatrick, B (1941). The British Empire in Australia: An Economic History 1834–1939, Melbourne University Press, Melbourne.
- Greasley, David, and Les Oxley. "A tale of two dominions: comparing the macroeconomic records of Australia and Canada since 1870." Economic History Review 51.2 (1998): 294–318. online
- Gregory, R.G., and N. G. Butlin. Recovery from the Depression: Australia and the World Economy in the 1930s (1989)
- Macfarlane, I. J. "Australian Monetary Policy in the Last Quarter of the Twentieth Century"]. Reserve Bank of Australia Bulletin, October 1998) online
- McLean, Ian W (2016). Why Australia Prospered: The Shifting Sources of Economic Growth, Princeton U.P.
- McLean, Ian W. "Australian economic growth in historical perspective." Economic Record 80.250 (2004): 330–345. online
- Maddock, Rodney, and Ian W. McLean, eds. The Australian economy in the long run (Cambridge University Press, 1987).
- Millmow, Alex. A History of Australasian Economic Thought (Routledge, 2017), 250 pp. online review
- Oxley, Les. "Australasia." in An Economist’s Guide to Economic History in Matthias Blum and Christopher L. Colvin, eds. (Palgrave Macmillan, Cham, 2018) pp. 309–317. online
- Reid, Alan (1976), The Whitlam Venture, Hill of Content, ISBN 978-0-85572-079-7
- Schedvin, C. Boris. "Midas and the merino: a perspective on Australian economic historiography." Economic History Review 32.4 (1979): 542-556. JSTOR 2595068
- Schedvin, Carl Boris. "The Australian economy on the hinge of history." Australian Economic Review 20.1 (1987): 20-30.
- Schedvin, Carl Boris. "Environment, economy and Australian biology, 1890–1939." Australian Historical Studies 21.82 (1984): 11-28.
- Shann, Edward [1930] (2016). An Economic History of Australia. Cambridge UP
- Sinclair, W. A. (1976). The Process of Economic Development in Australia. Melbourne: Cheshire.
- Snooks, G.D. (1994). Portrait of the Family within the Total Economy, Australia Since 1788. Cambridge UP.
- Unstead, R. J. "From Bullock Dray to Tin Lizzie." History Today (June 1968), Vol. 18 Issue 6, pp 406–414 online. Covers transportation 1788 to 1920, regarding ships, bullock drays, concord coaches, camels, railways, buggies, horse bucks, trams, and automobiles.
- Ville, Simon and Glenn Withers, eds. The Cambridge Economic History of Australia (Cambridge UP, 2015).
- Wheelwright, E.L., and Ken Buckley. eds. Essays in the Political Economy of Australian Capitalism (4 vol, 1975-1980) online vol 4, wide-ranging topical essays by experts.
