= Systems of Survival =

1992 book by Jane Jacobs

- First edition cover
- Author: Jane Jacobs
- Language: English
- Subject: Ethics
- Genre: Non-fiction
- Publisher: Random House, Inc.
- Publication date: 1992
- Publication place: United States
- Media type: Print
- Pages: 236 pp.
- ISBN: 0-394-55079-X
- OCLC: 28709402

Systems of Survival: A Dialogue on the Moral Foundations of Commerce and Politics is a 1992 book written by American urban activist Jane Jacobs.

It describes two fundamental and distinct ethical systems, or "syndromes" as she calls them: that of the Guardian and that of Commerce. She argues that these supply direction for the conduct of human life within societies, and understanding the tension between them can help us with public policy and personal choices.

== Terminology ==
Jacobs uses the term "ethical syndrome" rather than "ethical system". "Syndrome" in her usage does not mean "disease" or "disorder", but merely, from its Greek roots, "set of elements that go together". She argues that each syndrome arose naturally out of different modes of human behavior, but that they can conflict and cause serious problems if not understood.

== Description ==
In the preface, Jacobs explains, “This book explores the morals and values that underpin viable working life. Like the other animals, we find and pick up what we can use, and appropriate territories. But unlike the other animals, we also trade and produce for trade. Because we possess these two radically different ways of dealing with our needs, we also have two radically different systems of morals and values – both systems valid and necessary.”

The book is written in a form of a platonic dialogue where the characters discover and explore the principles that make up each of the two syndromes. Jacobs explains that there are many other moral precepts that are shared by both systems and are not discussed at any length.

One system is the Guardian Moral Syndrome and contains 15 precepts, like “Shun Trading,” and “Adhere to Tradition.” This system arose primarily to satisfy the needs of organizing and managing territories. It became the code for warriors, governments, religions, and some private organizations.

The other system is the Commercial Moral Syndrome and also is made of 15 principles like, “Shun Force,” and “Compete.” It came into being to support human activities around trade and the production of goods.

Moral precepts
| Guardian Syndrome | Commercial Syndrome |
|---|---|
| Shun trading; Exert prowess; Be obedient and disciplined; Adhere to tradition; Respect hierarchy; Be loyal; Take vengeance; Deceive for the sake of the task; Make rich use of leisure; Be ostentatious; Dispense largesse; Be exclusive; Show fortitude; Be fatalistic; Treasure honor | Shun force; Compete; Be efficient; Be open to inventiveness and novelty; Use initiative and enterprise; Come to voluntary agreements; Respect contracts; Dissent for the sake of the task; Be industrious; Be thrifty; Invest for productive purposes; Collaborate easily with strangers and aliens; Promote comfort and convenience; Be optimistic; Be honest |

The precepts that make up a syndrome are fleshed out. Their historical roots, the cultural examples, and their logical implications are looked at. Their relation to other precepts in the same syndrome are demonstrated. And they are contrasted with precepts in the other syndrome. For example, in the Guardian syndrome there is the precept "Deceive for the sake of the task." Summarized below are points Jacobs made about that precept:

1. Deception arises from man's early days as a hunters — hunters deceive prey.
2. Deception is part of warfare, as well as police tactics and diplomacy.
3. Deception must be for the purpose of achieving a guardian task, not a personal agenda.
4. It is moral to deceive an outsider but not one of the other guardians — that would be disloyal.
5. If an action is to achieve a guardian task and the deception is not aimed at members of the guardian organization, then it is an esteemed guardian action — virtuous.

== Conflicts ==
Conflicts occur, according to Jacobs, when the precepts appropriate to one syndrome are applied to the other. This always generates problems. Furthermore, it is inevitable that problematic intermixing of the syndromes will occur over time, resulting in what she refers to as monstrous moral hybrids.

There are two main approaches to managing the separation of the two syndromes, neither of which is fully effective over time:

1. Caste systems – Establishing rigidly separated castes, with each caste being limited, by law and tradition, to use of one or the other of the two syndromes.
2. Knowledgeable flexibility – Having ways for people to shift back and forth between the two syndromes in an orderly way, so that the syndromes are used alternately but are not mixed in a harmful manner.

== Quotes ==
The following are quotes from a chapter on the Guardian Syndrome where the discussion moves to the moral precept of loyalty. “...If any single precept can be called a key or central in guardian morality, it is Be Loyal. Governments regard treason as the most wicked crime, bar none.”

And later, "Machiavelli’s famous advice to the Prince seems to cover many topics, and its ostensible theme is prowess, but its gist is loyalty: its indispensability to a successful prince. He dwells on it from every angle. How to deserve loyalty. How to win it, buy it, inculcate it, cultivate it, terrorize people into it. How to subvert loyalty to rival princes or states. How to sniff out disloyalty and deal with it. All his digressions lead back to loyalty.”

== Editions ==
- Jacobs, Jane (1992). Systems of Survival. Random House, Inc. ISBN 0-394-55079-X.

== Reception ==
- The NY Times' reviewer Alan Wolfe said:

"...Ms. Jacobs, with her unorthodox intelligence, often produces new insights"

- Timothy B. Lee writing in Forbes magazine said:

"The key insight of the book is that problems arise when the two syndromes are mixed. Divided loyalty in government can lead to corruption and civil war, so the guardian syndrome prohibits trading, because it can produce divided loyalty. We prohibit government officials from trading cash for favors because we want our government to be exclusively loyal to the interests of the general public as reflected by our laws and elected officials."
