= Green Worker Cooperatives =

U.S. non-profit organization

Coordinates: 40°50′55.03″N 73°54′20.58″W

- Type: Worker cooperative
- Founded: 2004
- Headquarters: South Bronx, New York City, New York, United States
- Website: greenworker.coop

Green Worker Cooperatives (GWC) is a non-profit organization that incubates environmentally sustainable worker cooperatives in the South Bronx of New York City. The organization, founded in 2003 by Omar Freilla, seeks to create green-collar jobs and promotes environmental justice through the creation of cooperatives. GWC is a member of the United States Federation of Worker Cooperatives.

In 2008, Green Worker Cooperatives started ReBuilders Source, a worker cooperative that reuses discarded building materials. Founder Freilla received the Rockefeller Foundation’s Jane Jacobs Medal and $100,000 which he used to finance the organization. Rebuilders Source also received a $70,000 grant from Citgo.
