= Import replacement =

Economic theory

Import replacement refers to an urban free market economic process of entrepreneurs replacing the imports of the city with production from within the city.

The idea was invented by Jane Jacobs who spun off from the idea of import substitution developed by Andre Gunder Frank and widely discussed during the first and second Latin American debt crisis. Import substitution is a national economic theory implying that if a nation substituted its imports with national production the nation would become wealthier, whereas Jacob's idea is entirely about cities and could be called urban import substitution. However, even this would lead to confusion since, in practice, import substitution in India and Latin America was government subsidized and mandated, whereas Jacobs' concept of import replacement is a free market process of discovery and division of labor within a city.
