= Jane's Walk =

Walking tour series

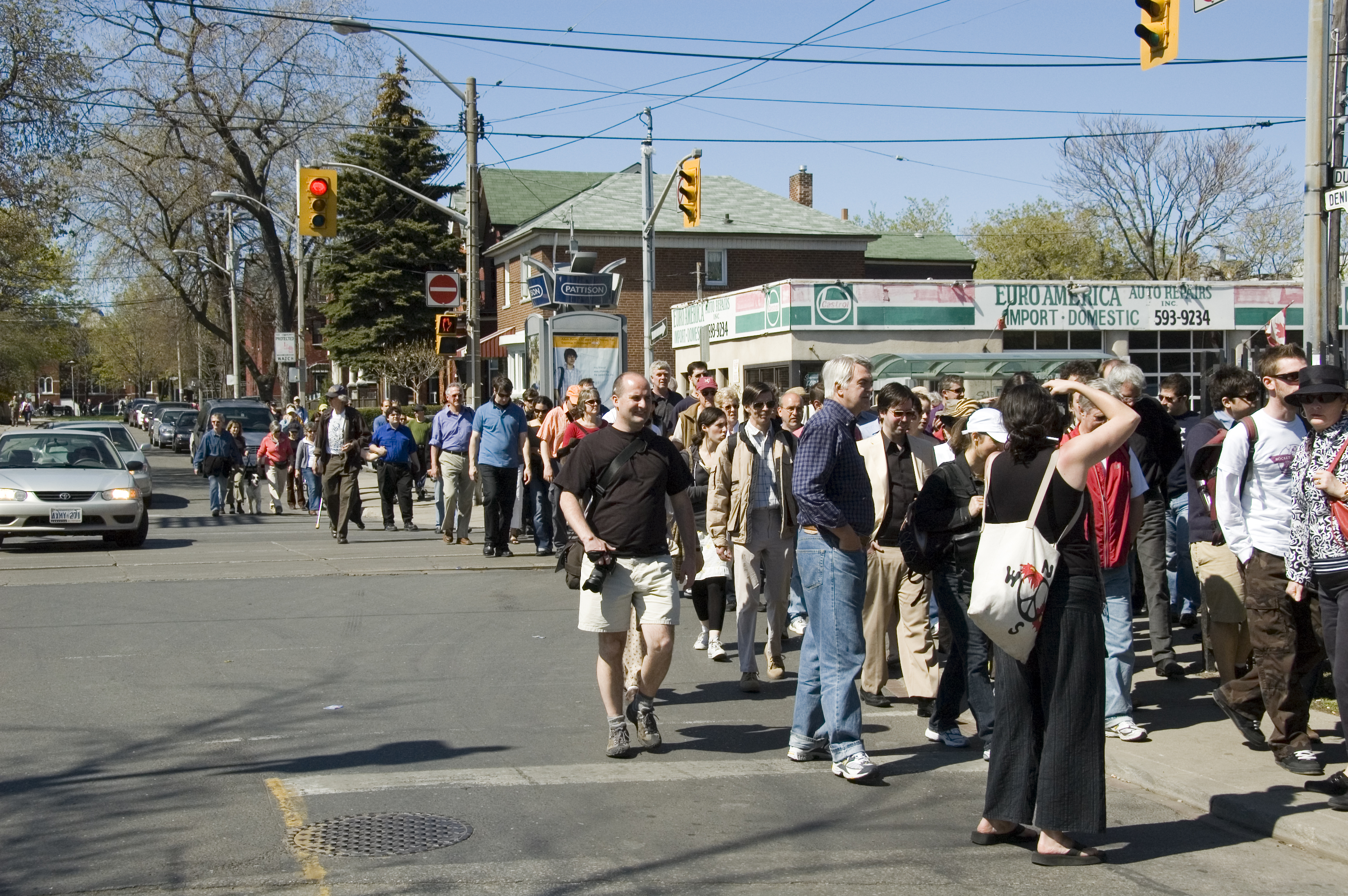
Inaugural Jane's Walk, Toronto, May 2007

Jane's Walk is a neighbourhood walking tour that takes place in hundreds of cities each year. These are walking conversations and create space for civic dialogue, neighbourhood pride and center stories by people not always invited to the table. Named after urban activist and writer Jane Jacobs, Jane's Walks are held annually during the first weekend in May to coincide with her birthday, May 4.

Jane's Walks are led by volunteers and are offered for free. They can be led by anyone who has an interest in the neighbourhoods where they live, work, play or socialize. The walks are not always about architecture and heritage and offer a more personal take on the local culture, the social history and the issues, challenges and achievements of the urban environment and the people who live in it.

Since its inception in 2006, in Toronto, Canada, Jane's Walks have taken place in cities across North America and around the world. In 2014, over 40,000 people took part in Jane's Walks and since 2014 Jane's Walks have taken place in over 500 cities. The governance of Jane's Walk and the Jane's Walk website are led by a fully volunteer steering committee of members around the world.

== See also ==
- Urban exploration
