= Jane Jacobs =

American–Canadian journalist, author, and activist (1916–2006)

Jane Jacobs OC OOnt
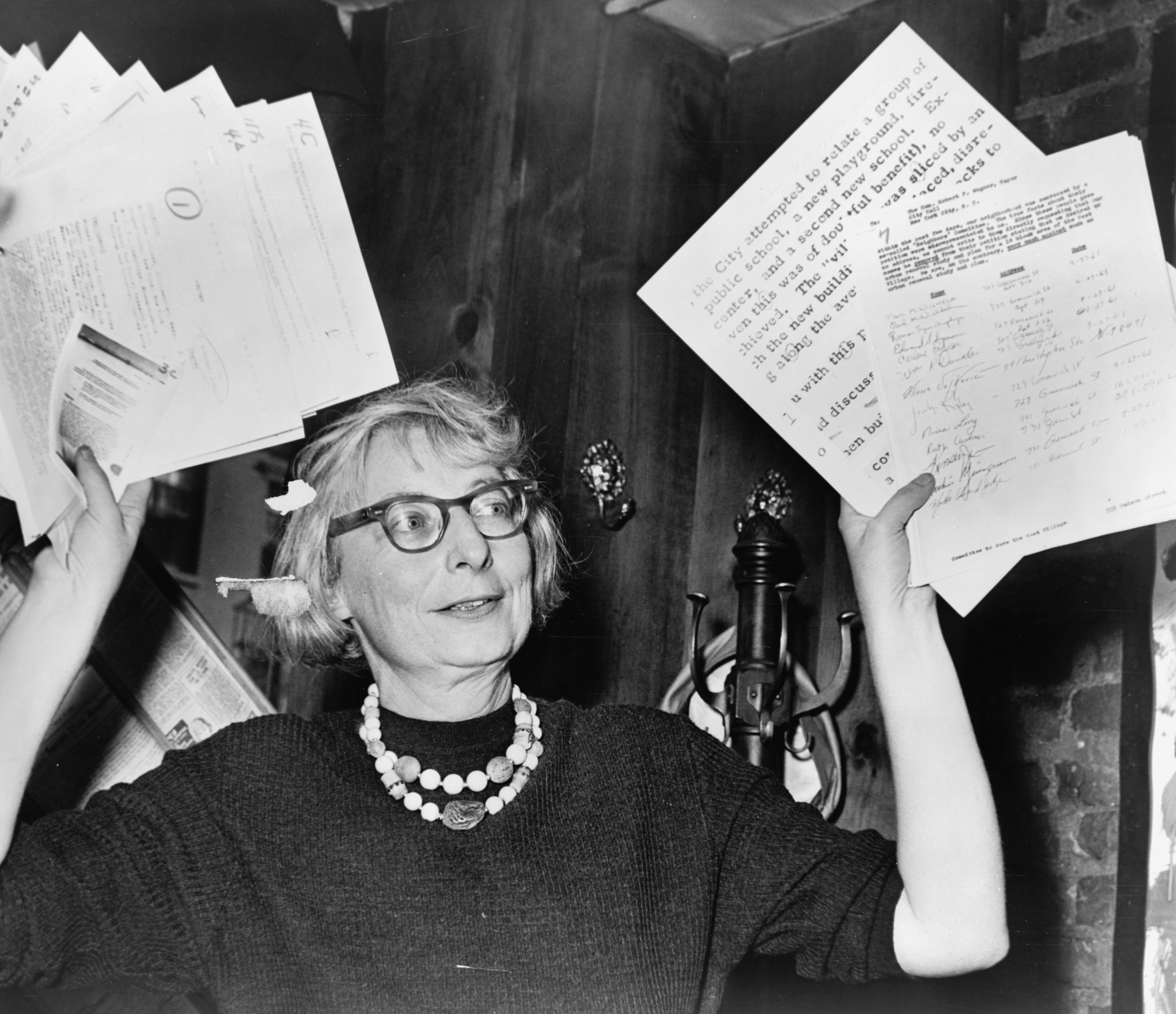
- Jacobs as chair of a Greenwich Village civic group at a 1961 press conference
- Born: Jane Isabel Butzner; 4 May 1916; Scranton, Pennsylvania, US
- Died: 25 April 2006 (aged 89); Toronto, Ontario, Canada
- Occupations: Journalist; author; urban theorist; activist
- Employers: Amerika; Architectural Forum
- Organizations: Joint Committee to Stop the Lower Manhattan Expressway; Stop Spadina Save Our City Coordinating Committee
- Notable work: The Death and Life of Great American Cities (1961); Cities and the Wealth of Nations: Principles of Economic Life (1984)
- Spouse: Robert Jacobs (m. 1944)
- Awards: Vincent Scully Prize (2000)

Jane Isabel Jacobs (née Butzner; 4 May 1916 – 25 April 2006) was an American-Canadian journalist, author, theorist, and activist who influenced urban studies, sociology, and economics. Her book The Death and Life of Great American Cities (1961) argued that "urban renewal" and "slum clearance" did not respect the needs of city-dwellers.

Jacobs organized grassroots efforts to protect neighborhoods from urban renewal and slum clearance, in particular plans by Robert Moses to overhaul her own Greenwich Village neighborhood. She was instrumental in the eventual cancellation of the Lower Manhattan Expressway, which would have passed directly through the area of Manhattan that would later become known as SoHo, as well as part of Little Italy and Chinatown. She was arrested in 1968 for inciting a crowd at a public hearing on that project. After moving to Toronto in 1968, she joined the opposition to the Spadina Expressway and the associated network of expressways in Toronto that were planned and under construction.

Jacobs was often criticized as a woman and a writer who criticized experts in the male-dominated field of urban planning. Routinely, she was described first as a housewife, as she did not have a college degree or any formal training in urban planning; as a result, her lack of credentials was seized upon as grounds for criticism. The influence of her concepts eventually was acknowledged by highly respected professionals, such as Richard Florida and Robert Lucas.

== Early years ==
Jane Isabel Jacobs was born Jane Isabel Butzner in Scranton, Pennsylvania, the daughter of Bess Robison Butzner, a former teacher and nurse, and John Decker Butzner, a physician. They were a Protestant family. Her brother, John Decker Butzner Jr., served as a judge on the United States Court of Appeals for the Fourth Circuit. After graduation from Scranton High School, she worked for a year as the unpaid assistant to the women's page editor at the Scranton Tribune.

=== New York City ===
In 1935, during the Great Depression, she moved to New York City with her sister Betty. Jane Butzner took an immediate liking to Manhattan's Greenwich Village, which deviated some from the city's grid structure. The sisters soon moved there from Brooklyn.

During her early years in Manhattan, Jacobs held a variety of jobs working as a stenographer and freelance writer, writing about working districts in the city. These experiences, she later said, "gave me more of a notion of what was going on in the city and what business was like, what work was like". Her first job was for a trade magazine, as a secretary, then an editor. She sold articles to the Sunday Herald Tribune, Cue magazine, and Vogue.

She studied at Columbia University's School of General Studies for two years, taking courses in geology, zoology, law, political science, and economics. About the freedom to pursue study across her wide-ranging interests, she said:

For the first time I liked school and for the first time I made good marks. This was almost my undoing because after I had garnered, statistically, a certain number of credits I became the property of Barnard College at Columbia, and once I was the property of Barnard I had to take, it seemed, what Barnard wanted me to take, not what I wanted to learn. Fortunately my high-school marks had been so bad that Barnard decided I could not belong to it and I was therefore allowed to continue getting an education.

== Career ==
After attending Columbia University's School of General Studies for two years, Butzner found a job at Iron Age magazine. Her 1943 article on economic decline in Scranton was well publicized and led the Murray Corporation of America to locate a warplane factory there. Encouraged by this success, Butzner petitioned the War Production Board to support more operations in Scranton. Experiencing job discrimination at Iron Age, she also advocated for equal pay for women and for the right of workers to unionize.

=== Amerika ===
She became a feature writer for the Office of War Information and then a reporter for Amerika, a publication of the US State Department in the Russian language. While working there she met Robert Hyde Jacobs Jr., a Columbia-educated architect who was designing warplanes for Grumman. They married in 1944. Together they had a daughter, Burgin, and two sons, James and Ned. They bought a three-story building at 555 Hudson Street. Jane continued to write for Amerika after the war, while Robert left Grumman and resumed work as an architect. The Jacobses rejected the rapidly growing suburbs as "parasitic", choosing to remain in Greenwich Village. They renovated their house, in the middle of a mixed residential and commercial area, and created a garden in the backyard.

Working for the State Department during the McCarthy era, Jacobs received a questionnaire about her political beliefs and loyalties. Jacobs was anti-communist and had left the Federal Workers Union because of its apparent communist sympathies. Nevertheless, she was pro-union and purportedly appreciated the writing of Saul Alinsky, and therefore she was under suspicion. On 25 March 1952, Jacobs delivered her response to Conrad E. Snow, chairman of the Loyalty Security Board at the US Department of State. In her foreword to her answer, she said:

The other threat to the security of our tradition, I believe, lies at home. It is the current fear of radical ideas and of people who propound them. I do not agree with the extremists of either the left or the right, but I think they should be allowed to speak and to publish, both because they themselves have, and ought to have, rights, and once their rights are gone, the rights of the rest of us are hardly safe.

=== Architectural Forum ===
Jacobs left Amerika in 1952 when it announced its relocation to Washington, DC. She then found a well-paying job at Architectural Forum, published by Henry Luce of Time Inc. She was hired as an associate editor. After early success in that position, Jacobs began to take assignments on urban planning and "urban blight". In 1954, she was assigned to cover the Society Hill development designed by Edmund Bacon. Although her editors expected a positive story, Jacobs criticized Bacon's project, reacting against its lack of concern for the poor African Americans who were directly affected. When Bacon showed Jacobs examples of undeveloped and developed blocks, she determined that "development" seemed to end community life on the street. When Jacobs returned to the offices of Architectural Forum, she began to question the 1950s consensus on urban planning.

In 1955, Jacobs met William Kirk, an Episcopal minister who worked in East Harlem. Kirk came to the Architectural Forum offices to describe the impact that "revitalization" had on East Harlem, and he introduced Jacobs to the neighborhood.

In 1956, while standing in for Douglas Haskell of Architectural Forum, Jacobs delivered a lecture at Harvard University. She addressed leading architects, urban planners, and intellectuals (including Lewis Mumford), speaking on the topic of East Harlem. She urged this audience to "respect – in the deepest sense – strips of chaos that have a weird wisdom of their own not yet encompassed in our concept of urban order". Contrary to her expectations, the talk was received with enthusiasm, but it also marked her as a threat to established urban planners, real estate owners, and developers. Architectural Forum printed the speech that year, along with photographs of East Harlem.

=== Rockefeller Foundation and Death and Life of Great American Cities ===
After reading her Harvard speech, William H. Whyte invited Jacobs to write an article for Fortune magazine. The resulting piece, "Downtown Is for People", appeared in a 1958 issue of Fortune, and marked her first public criticism of Robert Moses. Her criticism of the Lincoln Center was not popular with supporters of urban renewal at Architectural Forum and Fortune. C. D. Jackson, the publisher of Fortune, was outraged and over the telephone, demanded of Whyte: "Who is this crazy dame?"

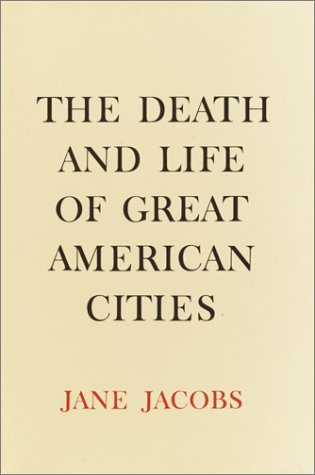
Cover of The Death and Life of Great American Cities

The Fortune article brought Jacobs to the attention of Chadbourne Gilpatric, then associate director of the Humanities Division at the Rockefeller Foundation. The foundation had moved aggressively into urban topics, with a recent award to the Massachusetts Institute of Technology for studies of urban aesthetics that would culminate in the publication of Kevin A. Lynch's Image of the City. In May 1958, Gilpatric invited Jacobs to begin serving as a reviewer for grant proposals. Later that year, the Rockefeller Foundation awarded a grant to Jacobs to produce a critical study of city planning and urban life in the US. (From the mid-1950s to the mid-1960s, the foundation's Humanities Division sponsored an "Urban Design Studies" research program, of which Jacobs was the best known grantee.) Gilpatric encouraged Jacobs to "explor[e] the field of urban design to look for ideas and actions which may improve thinking on how the design of cities might better serve urban life, including cultural and humane value." Affiliating with The New School (then called The New School for Social Research), she spent three years conducting research and writing drafts. In 1961, Random House published the result: The Death and Life of Great American Cities.

The Death and Life of Great American Cities remains one of the most influential books in the history of American city planning. She coined the terms "mixed primary uses", and "eyes on the street", which were adopted professionally in urban design, sociology, and many other fields. Jacobs painted a devastating picture of the profession of city planning, labeling it a pseudoscience. This angered the male-dominated urban planning profession. Jacobs was criticized with ad hominem attacks, being called a "militant dame" and a "housewife": an amateur who had no right to interfere with an established discipline. One planner dismissed Jacobs's book as "bitter coffee-house rambling". Robert Moses, sent a copy, called it "intemperate and also libelous ... Sell this junk to someone else." Later, her book was criticized from the left for leaving out race and openly endorsing gentrification, which Jacobs referred to as "unslumming".

In 1962, she resigned her position at Architectural Forum to become a full-time author and concentrate on raising her children. In other political activities she became an opponent of the Vietnam War, marched on the Pentagon in October 1967, and criticized the construction of the World Trade Center as a disaster for Manhattan's waterfront.

=== Struggle for Greenwich Village ===
During the 1950s and 1960s, her home neighborhood of Greenwich Village was being transformed by city and state efforts to build housing (see, for example, Jacobs's 1961 fight to build the West Village Houses in lieu of large apartment houses), private developers, the expansion of New York University, and by the urban renewal plans of Robert Moses. Moses' plan, funded as "slum clearance" by Title I of the Housing Act of 1949, also called for several blocks to be razed and replaced with upscale high-rises. The plan forced 132 families out of their homes and displaced 1,000 small businesses – the result was Washington Square Village.

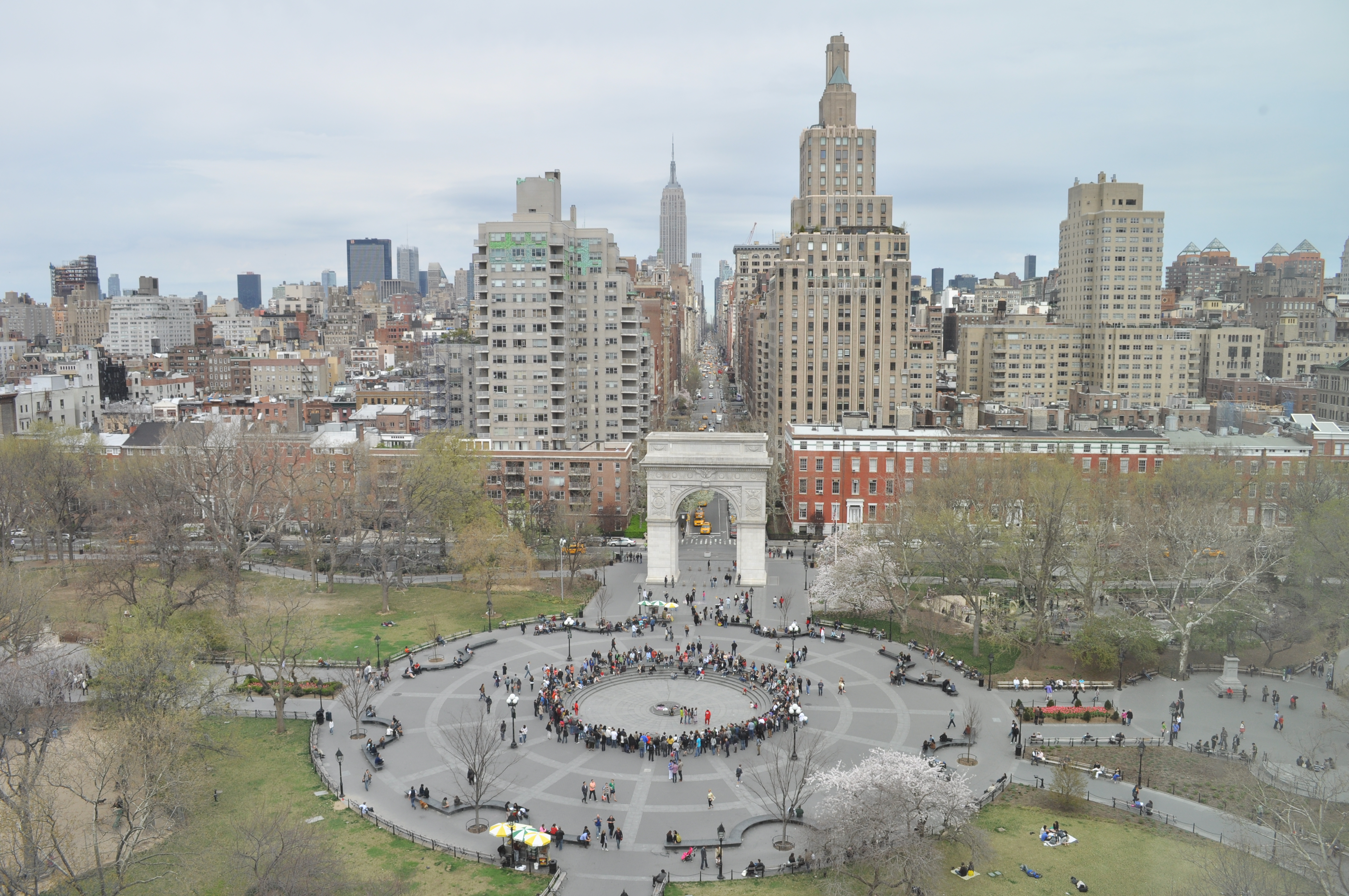
Jacobs fought to prevent Washington Square Park, pictured, from being demolished for a highway

As part of his efforts to revitalize the area, Moses had proposed the extension of Fifth Avenue through Washington Square Park in 1935. In the face of community opposition, Moses had shelved the project, but revived the idea in the 1950s. Moses argued that the Fifth Avenue extension would improve the flow of traffic through the neighborhood and provide access to the planned Lower Manhattan Expressway (LOMEX), which would connect the Manhattan Bridge and Williamsburg Bridge with the Holland Tunnel.

In response, local activist Shirley Hayes created the "Committee to Save Washington Square Park", a coalition of dozens of local neighborhood groups that opposed the roadway extension. Raymond S. Rubinow eventually took over the organization, changing its name to the "Joint Emergency Committee to Close Washington Square to Traffic". Jacob—recruited to the cause by Gerard La Mountain, a local Catholic priest whose church was in the path of the planned LOMEX route—had joined the committee under Hayes, but she took a more prominent role under Rubinow, reaching out to media outlets such as The Village Voice, which provided more sympathetic coverage than The New York Times. The committee gained the support of Margaret Mead, Eleanor Roosevelt, Lewis Mumford, Charles Abrams, and William H. Whyte, as well as Carmine De Sapio, a Greenwich Village resident and influential Democratic leader. De Sapio's involvement proved decisive. On 25 June 1958, the city closed Washington Square Park to traffic, and the joint committee held a ribbon tying (not cutting) ceremony.

Plans for LOMEX expressway continued despite growing community opposition in areas such as Little Italy. In the 1960s, Jacobs chaired the Joint Committee to Stop the Lower Manhattan Expressway. The New York Times was sympathetic to Moses, while The Village Voice covered community rallies and advocated against the expressway. Jacobs continued to fight the expressway when plans resurfaced in 1962, 1965, and 1968, and she became a local hero for her opposition to the project. She was arrested by a plainclothes police officer on 10 April 1968, at a public hearing during which the crowd had charged the stage and destroyed the stenographer's notes. She was accused of inciting a riot, criminal mischief, and obstructing public administration. After months of trials conducted in New York City (to which Jacobs commuted from Toronto), her charge was reduced to disorderly conduct.

New York: A Documentary Film devoted an hour of the eight-part, seventeen-and-a-half-hour series to the battle between Moses and Jacobs. Robert Caro's biography of Moses, The Power Broker, gives only passing mention to this event, however, despite Jacobs's strong influence on Caro. In 2017, Caro told an interviewer about the difficulty in cutting more than 300,000 words from his initial manuscript: "The section that I wrote on Jane Jacobs disappeared. To this day, when someone says: 'There's hardly a mention of Jane Jacobs,' I think, 'But I wrote a lot about her.' Every time I'm asked about that, I have this sick feeling."

== Life in Toronto ==
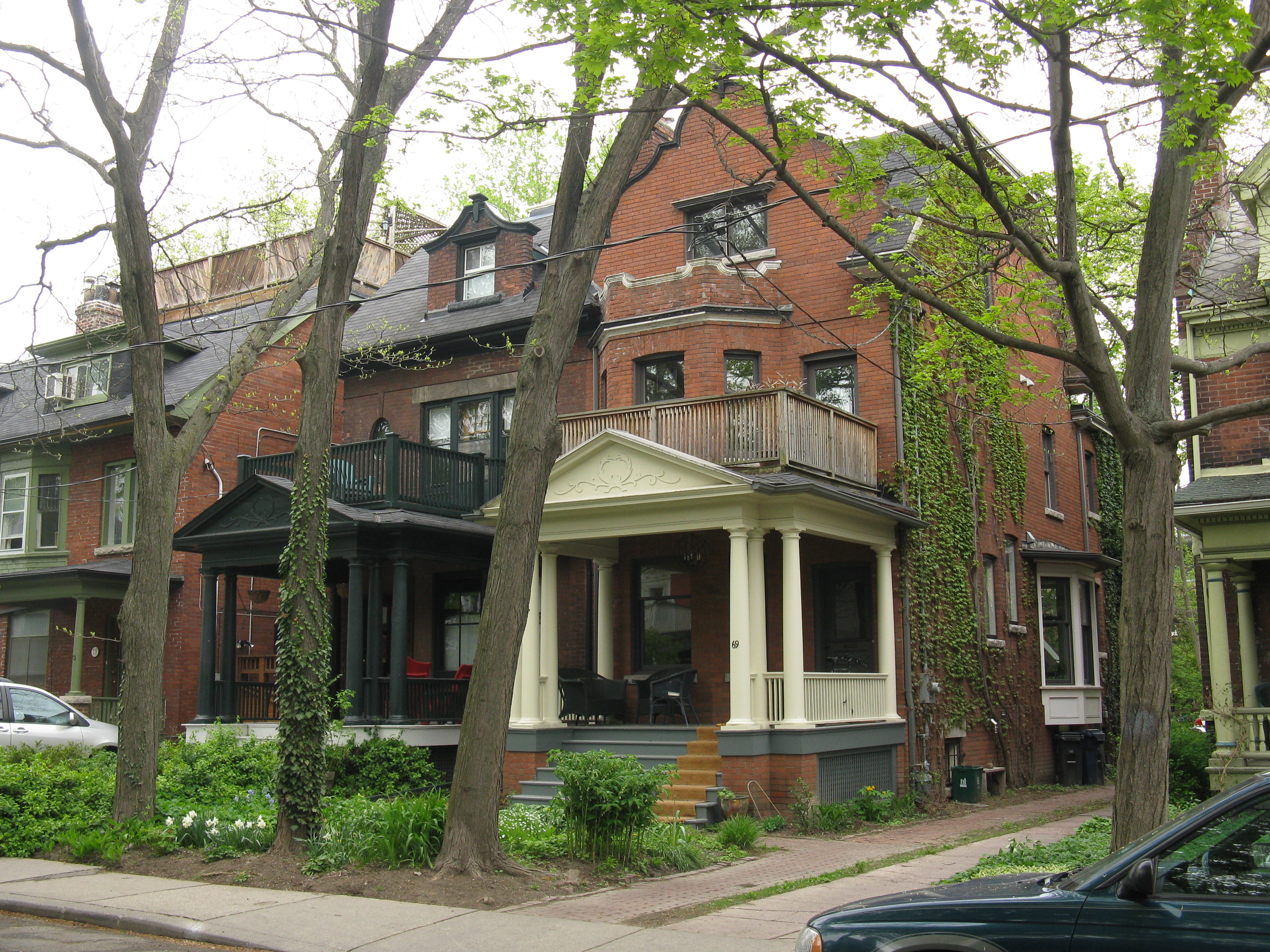
Jacobs lived at 69 Albany Avenue (white porch) in Toronto's Annex for 35 years

Soon after her arrest in 1968, Jacobs moved to Toronto, eventually settling at 69 Albany Avenue in The Annex from 1971 until her death in 2006. She decided to leave the US in part because she opposed the Vietnam War, she worried about the fate of her two draft-age sons, and she did not want to continue fighting the New York City government. She and her husband chose Toronto because it was pleasant and offered employment opportunities, and they moved to an area of Toronto that included so many Americans avoiding the draft that it was called the "American ghetto".

She quickly became a leading figure in her new city and helped stop the proposed Spadina Expressway. A frequent theme of her work was to ask whether cities were being built for people or for cars. She was arrested twice during demonstrations. She also had considerable influence on the regeneration of the St. Lawrence neighbourhood, a housing project regarded as a major success. She became a Canadian citizen in 1974 and later, she told writer James Howard Kunstler that dual citizenship was not possible at the time, implying that her US citizenship was lost.

In 1980, she offered a more urban perspective on Quebec's sovereignty in her book, The Question of Separatism: Quebec and the Struggle over Separation. Jacobs was an advocate of a Province of Toronto to separate the city proper from Ontario. Jacobs said, "Cities, to thrive in the twenty-first century, must separate themselves politically from their surrounding areas."

She was selected to be an officer of the Order of Canada in 1996 for her seminal writings and thought-provoking commentaries on urban development. The community and urban sociology section of the American Sociological Association awarded her its Outstanding Lifetime Contribution award in 2002. In 1997, the city government of Toronto sponsored a conference entitled, "Jane Jacobs: Ideas That Matter", which led to a book by the same name. At the end of the conference, the Jane Jacobs Prize was created. It includes an annual stipend of $5,000 for three years to be given to "celebrate Toronto's original, unsung heroes – by seeking out citizens who are engaged in activities that contribute to the city's vitality".

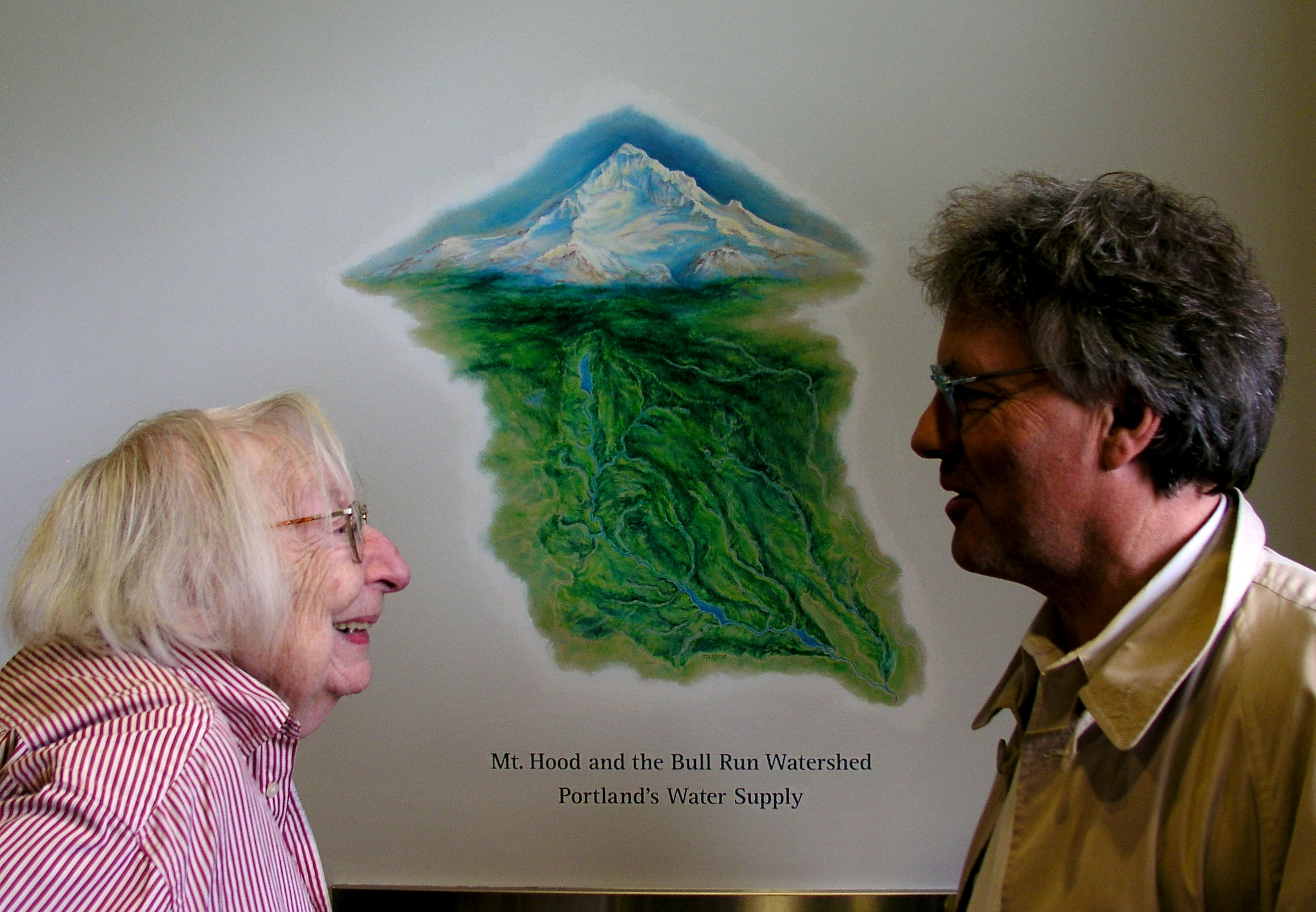
Jacobs with Ecotrust foreman Spencer Beebe in Portland, Oregon, 2004

Jacobs never shied away from expressing her political support for specific candidates. She opposed the 1997 amalgamation of the cities of Metro Toronto, fearing that individual neighbourhoods would have less power with the new structure. She backed an ecologist, Tooker Gomberg, who lost Toronto's 2000 mayoralty race, and she was an adviser to David Miller's successful mayoral campaign in 2003, at a time when he was seen as a longshot. During the mayoral campaign, Jacobs helped lobby against the construction of a bridge to join the city waterfront to island airport on the Toronto Islands. Following the election, the Toronto City Council's earlier decision to approve the bridge was reversed and the bridge construction project was stopped. The airport instead upgraded the ferry service and later built a pedestrian tunnel.

Jacobs also was active in a campaign against a plan of Royal St. George's College (an established school very close to the Jacobs residence in Toronto's Annex district) to reconfigure its facilities. Jacobs suggested not only that the redesign be stopped but that the school be forced from the neighbourhood entirely. Although Toronto council initially rejected the school's plans, the decision later was reversed – and the project was given the go-ahead by the Ontario Municipal Board (OMB) when opponents failed to produce credible witnesses and tried to withdraw from the case during the hearing.

She also had an influence on Vancouver's urban planning. Jacobs has been called "the mother of Vancouverism", referring to that city's use of her "density done well" philosophy.

== Death ==
Jacobs died in Toronto Western Hospital aged 89, on 25 April 2006, apparently of a stroke. She was survived by a brother, James Butzner (d. 2009); a daughter, Burgin Jacobs, her sons, James and Ned of Vancouver, and by two grandchildren and two great-grandchildren. Upon her death her family's statement noted: "What's important is not that she died but that she lived, and that her life's work has greatly influenced the way we think. Please remember her by reading her books and implementing her ideas".

== Legacy ==
Jacobs is credited, along with Lewis Mumford, with inspiring the New Urbanist movement. She has been characterized as a major influence on decentralist and radical centrist thought. She discussed her legacy in an interview with Reason magazine.

Reason: What do you think you'll be remembered for most? You were the one who stood up to the federal bulldozers and the urban renewal people and said they were destroying the lifeblood of these cities. Is that what it will be?

Jacobs: No. If I were to be remembered as a really important thinker of the century, the most important thing I've contributed is my discussion of what makes economic expansion happen. This is something that has puzzled people always. I think I've figured out what it is.

Expansion and development are two different things. Development is differentiation of what already existed. Practically every new thing that happens is a differentiation of a previous thing, from a new shoe sole to changes in legal codes. Expansion is an actual growth in size or volume of activity. That is a different thing.

I've gone at it two different ways. Way back when I wrote The Economy of Cities, I wrote about import replacing and how that expands, not just the economy of the place where it occurs, but economic life altogether. As a city replaces imports, it shifts its imports. It doesn't import less. And yet it has everything it had before.

Reason: It's not a zero-sum game. It's a bigger, growing pie.

Jacobs: That's the actual mechanism of it. The theory of it is what I explain in The Nature of Economies. I equate it to what happens with biomass, the sum total of all flora and fauna in an area. The energy, the material that's involved in this, doesn't just escape the community as an export. It continues being used in a community, just as in a rainforest the waste from certain organisms and various plants and animals gets used by other ones in the place.

— Jane Jacobs, "City Views: Urban studies legend Jane Jacobs on gentrification, the New Urbanism, and her legacy", Reason, June 2001, Interviewer: Bill Steigerwald

While Jacobs saw her greatest legacy to be her contributions to economic theory, it is in the realm of urban planning that she has had her most extensive effect. Her observations about the ways in which cities function revolutionized the urban planning profession and discredited many accepted planning models that had dominated mid-century planning. The influential Harvard economist Edward Glaeser, known for his work on urban studies, acknowledged that Jane Jacobs (1960s) had been prescient in attacking Moses for "replacing well-functioning neighborhoods with Le Corbusier-inspired towers". Glaeser agreed that these housing projects proved to be Moses' greatest failures, "Moses spent millions and evicted tens of thousands to create buildings that became centers of crime, poverty, and despair."

She also was famous for introducing concepts such as the "Ballet of the Sidewalk" and "Eyes on the Street", a reference to what would later be known as natural surveillance. The concept had a huge influence on planners and architects such as Oscar Newman, who prepared the idea through a series of studies that would culminate in his defensible space theory. The work of Jacobs and Newman would go on to affect American housing policy through the HOPE VI Program, an effort by the United States Department of Housing and Urban Development to demolish the high-rise public housing projects so reviled by Jacobs and to replace them with low-rise, mixed-income housing.

Throughout her life, Jacobs fought to alter the way in which city development was approached. By arguing that cities were living beings and ecosystems, she advocated ideas such as "mixed use" development and bottom-up planning. Furthermore, her harsh criticisms of "slum clearing" and "high-rise housing" projects were instrumental in discrediting these once universally supported planning practices.

Jacobs is remembered as being an advocate for the mindful development of cities, and for leaving "a legacy of empowerment for citizens to trust their common sense and become advocates for their place".

Despite the fact that Jacobs mainly focused on New York City, her arguments have been identified as universal. For instance, her opposition against the demolition of urban neighborhoods for projects of urban renewal had "special resonance" in Melbourne, Australia. In Melbourne in the 1960s, resident associations fought against large-scale high-rise housing projects of the Housing Commission of Victoria, which they argued had little regard for the impact on local communities.

Jacobs fought an uphill battle against dominant trends of planning. Despite the United States remaining very much a suburban nation, the work of Jacobs has contributed to city living being rehabilitated and revitalized. Because of her ideas, today, many distressed urban neighborhoods are more likely to be gentrified than cleared for redevelopment.

It may be that we have become so feckless as a people that we no longer care how things do work, but only what kind of quick, easy outer impression they give. If so, there is little hope for our cities or probably for much else in our society. But I do not think this is so.

— Jane Jacobs, The Death And Life of Great American Cities, 1961

In her book 'Death and Life of Great American Cities,' written in 1961, Ms. Jacobs's enormous achievement was to transcend her own withering critique of 20th-century urban planning and propose radically new principles for rebuilding cities. At a time when both common and inspired wisdom called for bulldozing slums and opening up city space, Ms. Jacobs's prescription was ever more diversity, density and dynamism – in effect, to crowd people and activities together in a jumping, joyous urban jumble.

— Martin Douglas, The New York Times, 25 April 2006

Samuel R. Delany's book Times Square Red, Times Square Blue relies heavily on The Death and Life of Great American Cities in its analysis of the nature of social relations within the realm of urban studies.

=== Jane Jacobs Days ===
After the death of Jacobs in April 2006, New York City Mayor Michael Bloomberg announced a Jane Jacobs Day, held on 28 June 2006. The City of Toronto proclaimed her birthday the following year, 4 May 2007, as Jane Jacobs Day.

=== Jane's Walks ===
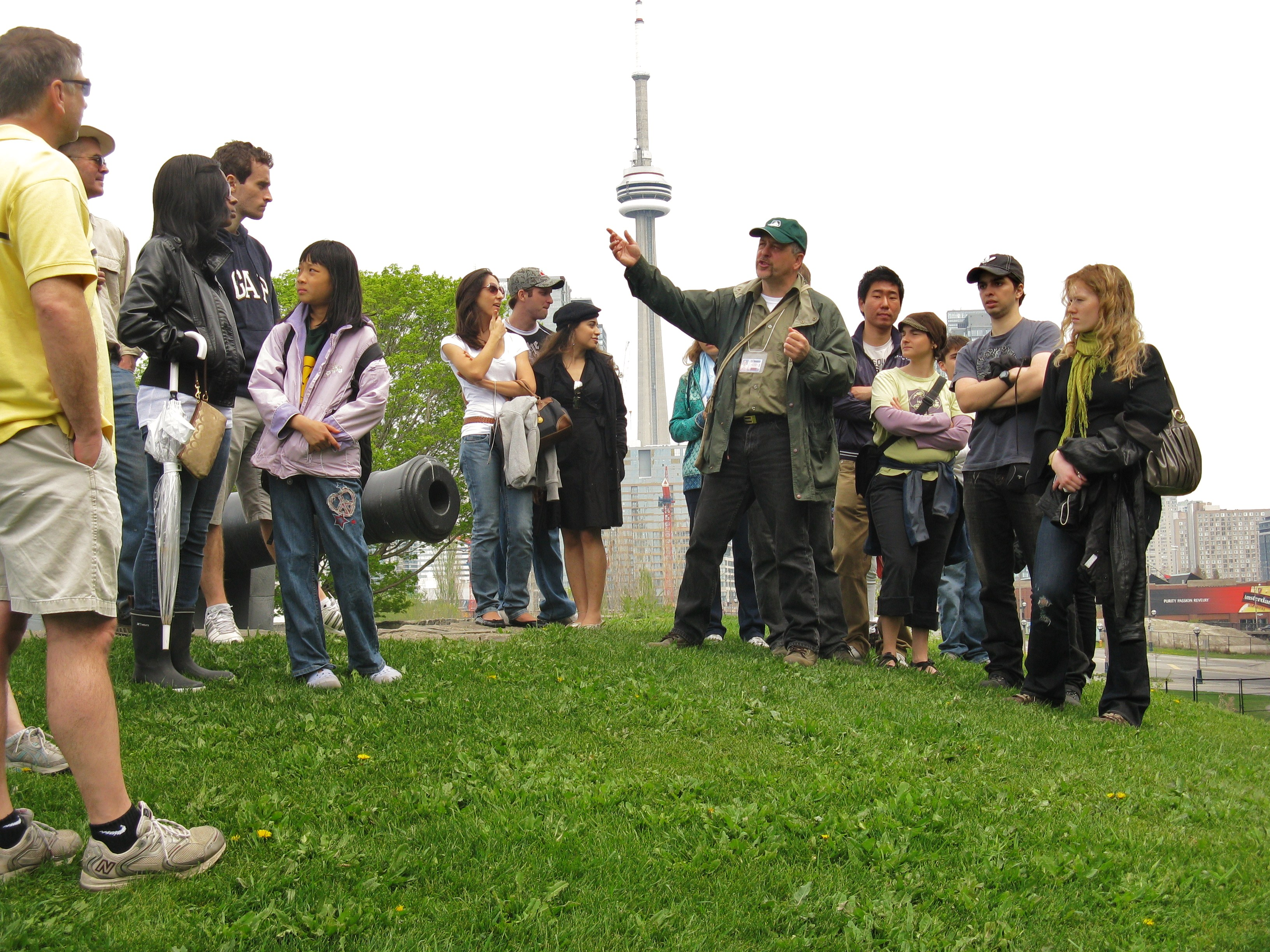
A "Jane's Walk" group pauses at Fort York National Historic Site in Toronto

In connection with Jane Jacobs Day in Toronto, two dozen free neighborhood walks in the city were offered that weekend (5 May 2007) as an active memorial to Jacobs, and they were dubbed Jane's Walks. Later, a Jane's Walk event was held in New York on 29–30 September 2007. In 2008, the event spread to eight cities and towns throughout Canada, and by 2016, Jane's Walks were taking place in 212 cities in 36 countries, on six continents. The interpretive walks typically apply ideas Jacobs identified or espoused to local areas, which are explored on foot and sometimes by bicycle. The walks normally take place in early May, on or close to her 4 May birth anniversary. Walks are organized and led by local volunteers, coordinated by a headquarters office in Toronto. There are more than 200 walks offered in Toronto, alone, in 2016, taking place on 6, 7 and 8 May.

=== Exhibitions ===
In 2016, to mark the hundredth birth anniversary of Jane Jacobs, a Toronto gallery staged "Jane at Home", an exhibition running from 29 April – 8 May. Curated by Jane's son, Jim Jacobs, it offered glimpses of her home life, where she also worked. Her Toronto living room was represented, based on the one at her Albany Avenue house in The Annex, where she often spoke with noted thinkers and political leaders including Marshall McLuhan, Paul Martin, and the Queen of the Netherlands. On display were her typewriter, original manuscripts, rediscovered photographs demonstrating her distinctive styles, and personal mementos. The exhibit included furniture from previous homes in New York (her dining room is set up) and from Scranton, Pennsylvania.

In 2007, the Municipal Art Society of New York partnered with the Rockefeller Foundation to host an exhibit focusing on "Jane Jacobs and the Future of New York", which opened at the society in September that year. The exhibit aimed to educate the public on her writings and activism and used tools to encourage new generations to become active in issues involving their own neighborhoods. An accompanying exhibit publication included essays and articles by such architecture critics, artists, activists, and journalists as Malcolm Gladwell, Reverend Billy, Robert Neuwirth, Tom Wolfe, Thomas de Monchaux, and William McDonough. Many of these contributors participated in a series of panel discussions on "Jane Jacobs and the Future of New York".

=== Jane Jacobs Medal ===
As a tribute to Jacobs, the Rockefeller Foundation, which had awarded grants to Jacobs in the 1950s and 1960s, announced on 9 February 2007, the creation of the Jane Jacobs Medal, "to recognize individuals who have made a significant contribution to thinking about urban design, specifically in New York City". Recipients include:

- Barry Benepe, co-founder of the New York City Green Market program and a founding member of Transportation Alternatives, was awarded with the inaugural Jane Jacobs Medal for Lifetime Leadership and a $100,000 cash prize in September 2007. The inaugural Jane Jacobs Medal for New Ideas and Activism was awarded to Omar Freilla, the founder of Green Worker Cooperatives in the South Bronx; Mr. Freilla donated his $100,000 to his organization.
- Peggy Shepard, executive director of West Harlem Environmental Action, received the 2008 Jane Jacobs Medal for Lifetime Leadership and Alexie Torres-Fleming, founder of Youth Ministries for Peace and Justice, received the award for New Ideas and Activism. Both women received their medals and $100,000 awards at a dinner ceremony in September 2008 in New York City.
- Damaris Reyes, executive director of Good Old Lower East Side (GOLES), received the 2009 Jane Jacobs Medal for New Ideas and Activism. Richard Kahan, as founder and CEO of the Urban Assembly, which created and manages 22 secondary public schools located in many of the lowest income neighborhoods in New York City, received the 2009 Jane Jacobs Medal for Lifetime Leadership. Both received $100,000, in addition to the medal.
- The 2010 recipients were Joshua David and Robert Hammond, whose work in establishing the High Line Park atop an unused elevated railroad line, led the foundation to award the 2010 Jane Jacobs Medal for New Ideas and Activism, along with $60,000 to each man. The 2010 Jane Jacobs Medal for Lifetime Leadership was given to Elizabeth Barlow Rogers, for her longtime work as writer, park administrator, and co-founder of Central Park Conservancy. She received $80,000 as well.

The Canadian Urban Institute offers an award to honor her, the Jane Jacobs Lifetime Achievement Award, to recognize a person "who has had significant impact on the health of their region consistent with Jane Jacob's belief that successful cities foster a place-based, community-centered approach". The 2011 winner was Eberhard Zeidler, while his daughter, Margie Zeidler, won the 2015 award. In 2012, Anne Golden took the prize "for her long-standing leadership in public policy, her academic work and her varied leadership experience in business, not-for-profit and government sectors". William (Bill) Teron accepted the 2013 award "for his influential career in public policy and passionate advocacy for quality design and commitment to development in the Ottawa area". In 2014, Jack Diamond was recognized for his "contribution to improving the built form and advocacy for cities and the future of the Greater Toronto Area".

In April 2014, Spacing was appointed the stewards of the Jane Jacobs Prize. Spacing, winners of the prize in 2010, has continued to provide the award with a new life and new ways of promoting (and finding) the winners.

=== Other honors ===
- Jane Jacobs Way, West Village, New York City (Hudson Street and Eleventh Street, New York, New York)
- Jane Jacobs Park, 11 Wellesley Street West, Toronto (construction began in 2016)
- Jane Jacobs sculptural chairs, Victoria Memorial Square (St. John's Square), Toronto
- Jane Jacobs Toronto Legacy Plaque, 69 Albany Avenue, Toronto
- Jacobs' Ladder, rose bushes dedicated by Grassroots Albany (neighbors) in 1997, Toronto
- Jane Jacobs Street, Mount Pleasant, South Carolina
- Jane Jacobs Street (Village of Cheshire) Black Mountain, North Carolina
- a Google Doodle marked the 100th anniversary of Jacobs's birth, on 4 May 2016, and was featured on Google's homepage in 15 countries on four continents
- a conference room at the offices of the New Economics Foundation in London is named in honor of Jacobs

Jacobs received the second Vincent Scully Prize from the National Building Museum in 2000.

=== Criticism ===
The planners and developers she fought against to preserve the West Village were among those who initially criticized her ideas. Robert Moses has generally been identified as her arch-rival during this period. One of their primary differences was their opposite views, the "top down" aggressive approach practiced by Moses contrasted the "bottom up" approach practiced by Jacobs that considered the community. Since then, Jacobs's ideas have been analysed many times, often in regard to the outcomes that their influences have produced.

In places such as the West Village, the factors that she argued would maintain economic and cultural diversity have led instead to gentrification and some of the most expensive real estate in the world. Her family's conversion of an old candy shop into a home is an example of the gentrifying trend that would continue under the influence of Jacobs's ideas.

Gentrification also was caused, however, by "the completely unexpected influx of affluent residents back into the inner city". The extent to which her ideas facilitated this phenomenon was at the time unimaginable. For example, she advocated the preservation of older buildings specifically because their lack of economic value made them affordable for poor people. In this respect, she saw them as "guarantors of social diversity". That many of these older structures have increased in economic value solely due to their age was implausible in 1961. Issues of gentrification have dominated criticism of Jane Jacobs's planning ideas.

Economist Tyler Cowen has criticized her ideas for not addressing problems of scale or infrastructure, and suggests that economists disagree with some of her approaches to development. For example, although her ideas of planning were praised at times as "universal", they are now thought inapplicable when a city grows from one million to ten million (as has happened many times in developing nations). Such arguments suggest that her ideas apply only to cities with similar issues to those of New York, where Jacobs developed many of them.

== Works ==
Jane Jacobs spent her life studying cities. Her books include:

=== The Death and Life of Great American Cities ===
The Death and Life of Great American Cities is her single-most influential book and, possibly, the most influential book on urban planning and cities. Published in 1961, this book was widely read by both planning professionals and the general public. The book is a strong critique of the urban renewal policies of the 1950s, which, she claimed, destroyed communities and created isolated, unnatural urban spaces. In the book, she celebrates the diversity and complexity of old mixed-use neighborhoods while lamenting the monotony and sterility of modern planning. Jacobs described the key factors for achieving diversity as (1) districts must serve multiple functions to allow for diverse and overlapping uses during the day, (2) blocks should be compact to allow for mixed uses, chance encounters, and commercial activities, (3) districts should include buildings of various ages and conditions to accommodate different users, and (4) districts should have sufficient populations to sustain vibrant atmospheres.

Jacobs advocated the abolition of zoning laws and restoration of free markets in land, which would result in dense, mixed-use neighborhoods and she frequently cited New York City's Greenwich Village as an example of a vibrant urban community.

Robert Caro has cited it as the strongest influence on The Power Broker, his Pulitzer-winning biography of Robert Moses, although Caro does not mention Jacobs by name in the book despite Jacobs's battles with Moses over his proposed Lower Manhattan Expressway. Caro reportedly cut a chapter about Jacobs due to his book's length.

Beyond the practical lessons in city design and planning that Death and Life offers, the theoretical underpinnings of the work challenge the modern development mindset. Jane Jacobs defends her positions with common sense and anecdotes.

=== The Economy of Cities ===
The thesis of this 1979 book is that cities are the primary drivers of economic development. Her main argument is that explosive economic growth derives from urban import replacement. Import replacement is the process of producing goods locally that formerly were imported, e.g., Tokyo bicycle factories replacing Tokyo bicycle importers in the 1800s. Jacobs claims that import replacement builds up local infrastructure, skills, and production. Jacobs also claims that the increased production is subsequently exported to other cities, giving those other cities a new opportunity to engage in import replacement, thus producing a positive cycle of growth.

In an interview with Bill Steigerwald in Reason, Jacobs said that if she is remembered for being a great intellectual she will be remembered not for her work concerning city planning, but for the discovery of import replacement. Critics erroneously claim that her ideas parrot the idea of import substitution advanced earlier by scholars such as Andre Gunder Frank. Import substitution was a national economic theory implying that if a nation substituted its imports with national production, the nation would become wealthier, whereas Jacob's idea is entirely about cities and could be called urban import substitution. However, even this would lead to confusion since in practice, import substitution in India and Latin America were government subsidized and mandated, whereas Jacobs's concept of import replacement is a free market process of discovery and division of labor within a city.

In the second part of the book, Jacobs argues that cities preceded agriculture. She argues that in cities trade in wild animals and grains allowed for the initial division of labor necessary for the discovery of husbandry and agriculture; these discoveries then moved out of the city due to land competition. It is commonly taught that agriculture preceded cities. This notion was promoted originally by archaeologist Vere Gordon Childe and in recent times, by Charles Keith Maisels. The apparent opposition between the traditional history and Jacobs' rests in differing definition of 'city', 'civilization', or 'urban'. Traditional history and archeology define 'urban' or 'civilization' as Synoecism – as a literate, socially stratified, monolithic political community, whereas, as one can see from The Economy of Cities or from Cities and the Wealth of Nations, Jacobs defined the city purely along the lines of geographically dense trade giving way to entrepreneurial discovery and subsequent improvements in the division of labor. Without the requirements of literacy, permanent and monumental building, or the signs of specialized civil and armed forces, 'cities' can be accurately interpreted as existing thousands of years before when Childe and Maisels place them.

=== The Question of Separatism ===
The Question of Separatism: Quebec and the Struggle over Sovereignty incorporated and expanded Jacobs's presentation of the 1979 Massey Lectures, entitled Canadian Cities and Sovereignty-Association. It was published in 1980 and reprinted in 2011 with a previously-unpublished 2005 interview with Robin Philpot on the subject in which she evokes the relative overlooking of that book among her usual readership. This was the first time Jacobs was requested to discuss it in an interview. Columnist Richard Gwyn advanced that while not openly criticizing her, English-speaking Canadian readers thought she did not understand how Canadian politics worked and that she was not being helpful in a time of distress for national unity (the 1980 referendum was just defeated by a vote of 60 per cent). The Question of Separatism was also not mentioned in the bibliography of her 2006 obituary in The Globe and Mail.

Jacobs's book advances the view that Quebec's eventual independence is best for Montreal, Toronto, the rest of Canada, and the world; and that such independence can be achieved peacefully. As precedent, she cites Norway's secession from Sweden and how it enriched both nations. The origins of the contemporary secessionist-movement in the Quiet Revolution are examined, along with Canada's historical reliance on natural resources and foreign-owned manufacturing for its own economic development. Jacobs asserts that such an approach is colonial and hence backward, citing by example, Canada buying its skis and furniture from Norway or Norwegian-owned factories in Canada, the latter procedure being a product of Canadian tariffs designed specifically to foster such factories.

The relevant public views of René Lévesque, Claude Ryan, and then Prime Minister Pierre Trudeau are also critically analyzed, an example being their failure to recognize that two respective, independent currencies are essential to the success of an independent Quebec and a smaller resultant Canada, an issue that is central to her book. Jacobs stresses the need for Montreal to continue developing its leadership of Québécois culture, but that ultimately, such a need can never be fulfilled by Montreal's increasing tendencies toward regional-city status, tendencies foretelling economic, political, and cultural subservience to English-speaking Toronto. Such an outcome, Jacobs believed, would in the long run doom Quebec's independence as much as it would hinder Canada's own future. She concludes with her observation that the popular equating of political secession with political and economic failure is the result of the Enlightenment, which perceived nature as a force for "standardization, uniformity, universality, and immutability". Since then, naturalists and their readers have gradually realized that nature is a force for diversity, and that, "diversity itself is of the essence of excellence". The right kind of secession, Jacobs states, can lead to the right kind of diversity, and Quebec and Canada are capable of both, and must achieve both, to survive.

=== Cities and the Wealth of Nations ===
Cities and the Wealth of Nations (1984) attempts to do for economics what The Death and Life of Great American Cities did for modern urban planning, although it has not received the same critical attention. Beginning with a concise treatment of classical economics, this book challenges one of the fundamental assumptions of the greatest economists. Classical (and Neo-classical) economists consider the nation-state to be the main player in macroeconomics. Jacobs argues that it is not the nation-state, rather it is the city that is the true player in this worldwide game. She restates the idea of import replacement from her earlier book The Economy of Cities, while speculating on the further ramifications of considering the city first and the nation second, or not at all.

A spectrum of economic regions

Along with the previous books focused on economics, Jacobs proposes an array of types of regional economies (stylized facts) which can help to understand their different challenges, and potential for development. One can start at the bottom end of the spectrum with the 'backward' region, which are economies who have lost their competitive advantages and are losing population or becoming dependent on largesse transfers from wealthier areas. Next are the 'supply regions', which are usually known as natural resource extraction towns, and may be very wealthy during their heyday, but often suffer a decline into backwardness if the resource has run-out or has been substituted on outside markets. Similar to this is the 'transplant region', a fundamental aspect of Jacobs economic theory. Transplant economies are usually manufacturing plants who have been moved from the location where the product was invented. The reason for the transplant is to save land, labour, fiscal, and transportation costs. Transplant regions are usually found along main transportation routes, where there is a large labour pool of available labour. Backward regions, Supply regions, and Transplant regions make up the most vulnerable types of economies to outside shocks and competition from low-cost production zones. The Jacobs spectrum of regions also includes types of cities which rely on classical principles of central-location. Jacobs discusses 'Entrepôt cities', which are economies based on the accumulation and warehousing of export goods, usually at a maritime port location. Next are 'Hub cities', or regional capitals, which are central locations for private markets and public services in a given geography. Finally, Jacobs presents the qualities of growing metropolitan areas. Jacobs defines the metropolis as a city that grows beyond its political borders. She terms the core city as the 'Import-Replacing' city. She terms the suburban sprawl of the metropolis as the 'City-Region'. Economic literature sometimes uses the term Jacobs agglomeration for these growing and innovative cities. CA Ramsay has proposed the term Forward Cities, as an echo to the opposing principle of 'Backward' economies.

According to Jacobs, economies are constantly evolving and may move in and out of any of these categories. However, for an export-based economy such as a supply region, or a transplant town, to develop into a Forward city, the economy must engage in what she terms new-work. This implies a diversification of the economy. Jacobs strongly encourages breakaway entrepreneurship and local investment capital to do this. The modus operandi may be in import-replacing, in world-first innovation, or the adoption of production which is new to the community. Jacobs also insists on the benefits of having a city-currency, which acts as a positive feedback mechanism, to help drive local innovation and import-replacement. It also protects from outside demand shocks.

=== Systems of Survival ===
Systems of Survival: A Dialogue on the Moral Foundations of Commerce and Politics (1992) moves outside of the city, studying the moral underpinnings of work. As with her other work, she used an observational approach. This book is written as a Platonic dialogue. It appears that she (as described by characters in her book) took newspaper clippings of moral judgments related to work, collected and sorted them to find that they fit two patterns of moral behavior that were mutually exclusive. She calls these two patterns "moral syndrome A", or commercial moral syndrome, and "moral syndrome B", or guardian moral syndrome. She claims that the commercial moral syndrome is applicable to business owners, scientists, farmers, and traders. Similarly, she claims that the guardian moral syndrome is applicable to government, charities, hunter-gatherers, and religious institutions. She also claims that these moral syndromes are fixed, and do not fluctuate over time.

It is important to stress that Jane Jacobs is providing a theory about the morality of work, and not all moral ideas. Moral ideas that are not included in her system are applicable to both syndromes.

Jane Jacobs goes on to describe what happens when these two moral syndromes are mixed, showing the work underpinnings of the Mafia and communism, and what happens when New York subway police are paid bonuses here – reinterpreted slightly as a part of the larger analysis.

=== The Nature of Economies ===
The Nature of Economies (2000), a dialog between friends concerning the premise: "human beings exist wholly within nature as part of the natural order in every respect" (p. ix), argues that the same principles underlie both ecosystems and economies: "development and co-development through differentiation and their combinations; expansion through diverse, multiple uses of energy; and self-maintenance through self-refueling" (p. 82). Jacobs also comments on the nature of economic and biological diversity and its role in the development and growth of the two kinds of systems.

Jacobs's characters discuss the four methods by which "dynamically stable systems" may evade collapse: "bifurcations; positive-feedback loops; negative-feedback controls; and emergency adaptations" (p. 86). Their conversations also cover the "double nature of fitness for survival" (traits to avoid destroying one's own habitat as well as success in competition to feed and breed, p. 119), and unpredictability including the butterfly effect characterized in terms of multiplicity of variables as well as disproportional response to cause, and self-organization where "a system can be making itself up as it goes along" (p. 137).

The book is infused with many real-world economic and biological examples, which help keep the book "down to earth" and comprehensible, if dense. Concepts are furnished with both economic and biological examples, showing their coherence in both worlds.

One particularly interesting insight is the creation of "something from nothing" – an economy from nowhere. In the biological world, free energy is given through sunlight, but in the economic world human creativity and natural resources supply this free energy, or at least starter energy. Another interesting insight is the creation of economic diversity through the combination of different technologies, for example the typewriter and television as inputs and outputs of a computer system: this can lead to the creation of "new species of work".

=== Dark Age Ahead ===
Published in 2004 by Random House, Dark Age Ahead posits Jacobs's argument that North American civilization shows signs of a spiral decline comparable to the Roman empire's collapse. Her discussion focuses on "five pillars of our culture that we depend on to stand firm", summarized as the nuclear family and community; quality in education; free thought in science; representational government and responsible taxes; and corporate and professional accountability. As the title of this book suggests, Jacobs's outlook is far more pessimistic than that of her previous works. However, in the conclusion she admits: "At a given time it is hard to tell whether forces of cultural life or death are in the ascendancy. Is suburban sprawl, with its murders of communities and wastes of land, time, and energy, a sign of decay? Or is rising interest in overcoming sprawl a sign of vigor and adaptability in North American culture? Arguably, either could turn out to be true." While Jacobs idealized US democracy, Dark Age Ahead echoes the skepticism and disappointment that led to her emigration to Canada in 1968. Later, she would indicate that North American cultures, among others, were grounded in a "plantation mentality" that was culturally and ecologically unsustainable.

== Writings ==
- Constitutional Chaff; Rejected Suggestions of the Constitutional Convention of 1787, With Explanatory Argument Compiled by Jane Butzner, (1941) Columbia University Press; Compiled by Jane Jacobs (Née Butzner), Reprinted 1970 by Kennikat Press, Port Washington, New York. ISBN 0804606056
- The Death and Life of Great American Cities (1961) New York: Random House. ISBN 0679600477
- The Economy of Cities (1969) ISBN 039470584X
- The Question of Separatism: Quebec and the Struggle over Sovereignty (1980 Random House and 2011 Baraka Books) ISBN 978-1926824062
- Cities and the Wealth of Nations (1985) ISBN 0394729110
- The Girl on the Hat (Children's Book Illustrated by Karen Reczuch), (June 1990) Oxford University Press. ISBN 978-0195407082
- Systems of Survival: A Dialogue on the Moral Foundations of Commerce and Politics (1992) ISBN 0679748164
- A Schoolteacher in Old Alaska: The Story of Hannah Breece (1995) Random House of Canada. ISBN 0679308180
- The Nature of Economies (2000) New York: Random House, The Modern Library. ISBN 0679603409
- Dark Age Ahead (2004) ISBN 1400062322
- Vital Little Plans: The Short Works of Jane Jacobs (2016) New York: Random House. ISBN 0399589600

== In popular culture ==
- Jacobs is the subject of the 2017 documentary film Citizen Jane: Battle for the City, which depicts her victories over Robert Moses and her philosophy of urban design.
- A fictionalized version of her is played by Alison Smith in 3 episodes (Season 1, 2 and 5) of the Amazon series The Marvelous Mrs. Maisel.
- The community organizer played by Cherry Jones in Motherless Brooklyn has drawn comparisons to Jane Jacobs. The director, Edward Norton, has clarified that the composite character was partially based on Jacobs, but more so on Hortense Gabel who was active a decade earlier.

== See also ==
- David Crombie
- Fred Gardiner
- Highway revolts in the United States
- Innovation economics
- Urban secession
- Urban vitality
