= Grid plan =

Urban plan in which city streets form a grid

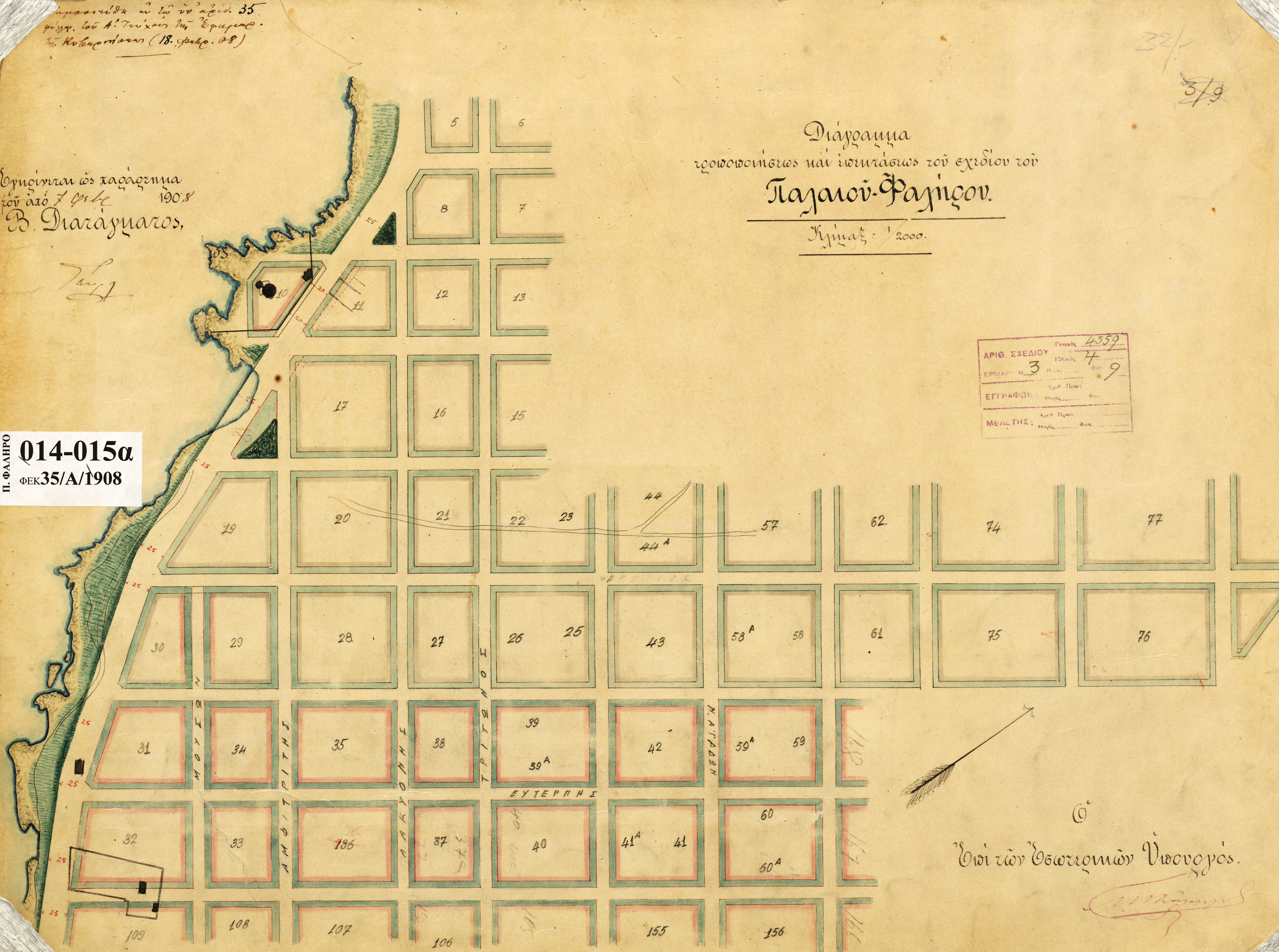
A simple grid plan from 1908 of Palaio Faliro.

In urban planning, the grid plan, grid street plan, or gridiron plan is a type of city plan in which streets run perpendicular (at right angles) to each other, forming a grid.

Two inherent characteristics of the grid plan, frequent intersections and orthogonal geometry, facilitate movement. The geometry helps with orientation and wayfinding and its frequent intersections with the choice and directness of route to desired destinations.

In ancient Rome, the grid plan method of land measurement was called centuriation. The grid plan dates from antiquity and originated in multiple cultures; some of the earliest planned cities were built using grid plans in the Indian subcontinent.

== History ==
=== Ancient grid plans ===
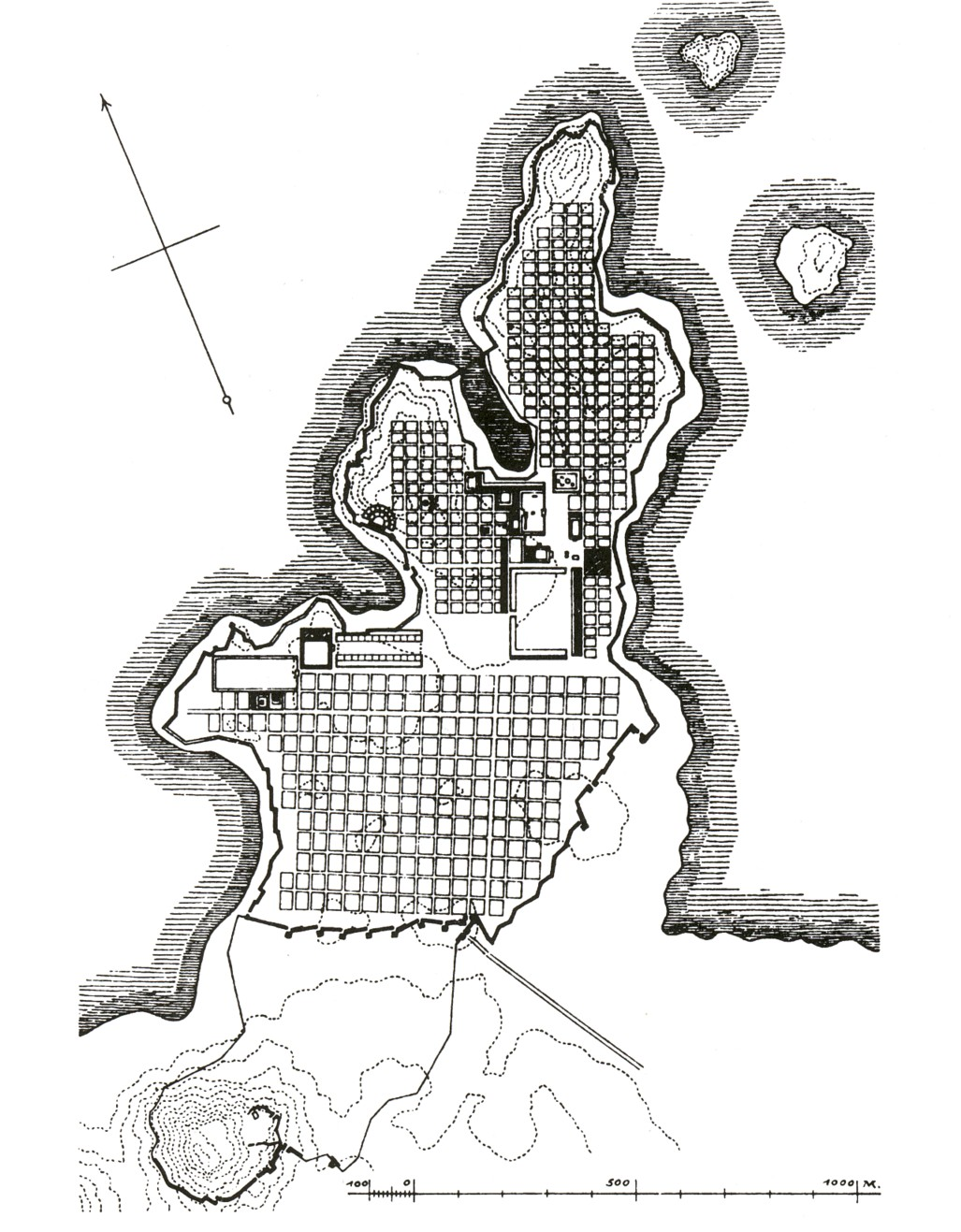
The grid plan of Miletus in the Classical period

By 2600 BC, Mohenjo-daro and Harappa, major cities of the Indus Valley Civilization, were built with blocks divided by a grid of straight streets, running north–south and east–west. Each block was subdivided by small lanes. The cities and monasteries of Sirkap, Taxila and Thimi (in the Indus and Kathmandu Valleys), dating from the 1st millennium BC to the 11th century AD, also had grid-based designs.

A workers' village (2570–2500 BC) at Giza, Egypt, housed a rotating labor force and was laid out in blocks of long galleries separated by streets in a formal grid. Many pyramid-cult cities used a common orientation: a north–south axis from the royal palace and an east–west axis from the temple, meeting at a central plaza where King and God merged and crossed.

Hammurabi, king of the Babylonian Empire in the 18th century BC, ordered the rebuilding of Babylon: constructing and restoring temples, city walls, public buildings, and irrigation canals. The streets of Babylon were wide and straight, intersected approximately at right angles, and were paved with bricks and bitumen.

In China, the tradition of grid plans is deeply rooted and continuous from the 15th century BC onward in the traditional urban planning of various ancient Chinese states. Guidelines put into written form in the Kaogongji during the Spring and Autumn period (770–476 BC) stated: "a capital city should be square on plan. Three gates on each side of the perimeter lead into the nine main streets that crisscross the city and define its grid-pattern. And for its layout the city should have the Royal Court situated in the south, the Marketplace in the north, the Imperial Ancestral Temple in the east and the Altar to the Gods of Land and Grain in the west."

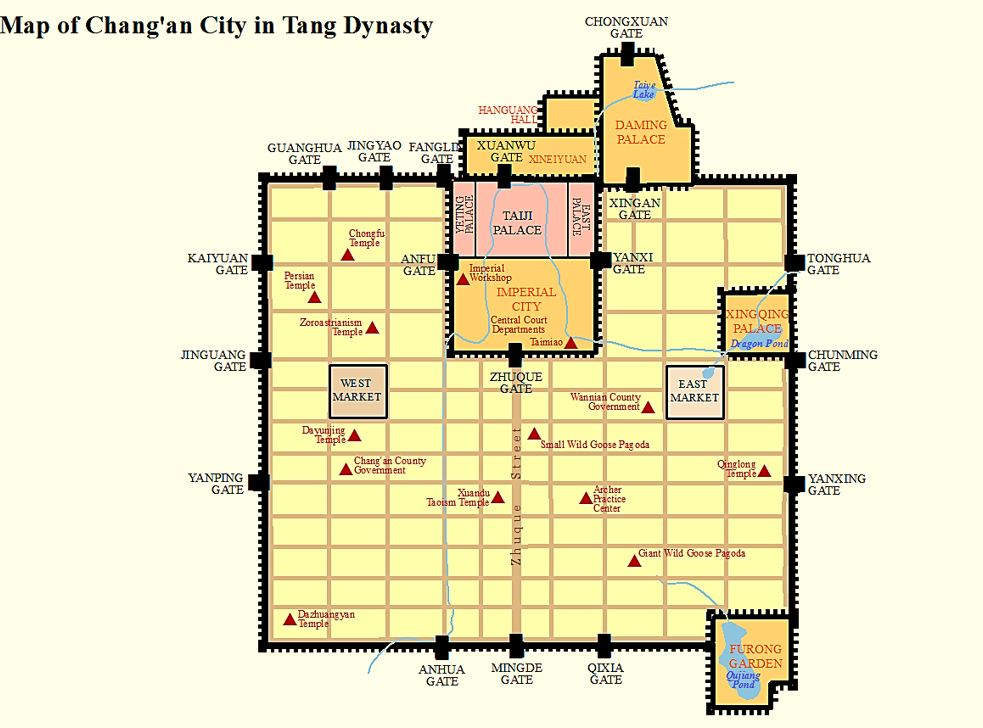
Map of Chang'an under the Tang dynasty

In Japan, Chinese grid design was deeply influential as well. Heian-kyō which was imperial capital of Japan 794 to 1868, was built in accordance with traditional Chinese feng shui following the model of ancient Chinese capitals of Chang'an and Luoyang; it is now known as Kyoto.

Teotihuacan, near modern-day Mexico City, is the largest ancient grid-plan site in the Americas. The city's grid covered 21 square kilometres (8 square miles).

Perhaps the most well-known grid system is that spread through the colonies of the Roman Empire. The archetypal Roman Grid was introduced to Italy first by the Greeks, with such information transferred by way of trade and conquest.

==== Ancient Greece ====
Although the idea of the grid was present in Hellenic societal and city planning, it was not pervasive prior to the 5th century BC. However, it slowly gained primacy through the work of Hippodamus of Miletus (498–408 BC), who planned and replanned many Greek cities in accordance with this form. The concept of a grid as the ideal method of town planning had become widely accepted by the time of Alexander the Great. His conquests were a step in the propagation of the grid plan throughout colonies, some as far-flung as Taxila in Pakistan, that would later be mirrored by the expansion of the Roman Empire. The Greek grid had its streets aligned roughly in relation to the cardinal points and generally looked to take advantage of visual cues based on the hilly landscape typical of Greece and Asia Minor. The street grid consisted of plateiai and stenophoi (equivalent to Roman decumani and cardines). This was probably best exemplified in Priene, in present-day western Turkey, where the orthogonal city grid was based on the cardinal points, on sloping terrain that struck views out towards a river and the city of Miletus.

==== Ancient Rome ====
Caesaraugusta Roman city matching the current Zaragoza city map: 1.- Decumano; 2.- Cardo; 3.- Foro de Caesaraugusta; 4.- Puerto fluvial; 5.- Termas públicas; 6.- Teatro; 7.- Muralla

The Etruscan people, whose territories in Italy encompassed what would eventually become Rome, founded what is now the city of Marzabotto at the end of the 6th century BC. Its layout was based on Greek Ionic ideas, and it was here that the main east–west and north–south axes of a town (the decumanus maximus and cardo maximus respectively) could first be seen in Italy. According to Stanislawski (1946), the Romans did use grids until the time of the late Republic or early Empire, when they introduced centuriation, a system which they spread around the Mediterranean and into northern Europe later on.

The military expansion of this period facilitated the adoption of the grid form as standard: the Romans established castra (forts or camps) first as military centres; some of them developed into administrative hubs. The Roman grid was similar in form to the Greek version of a grid but allowed for practical considerations. For example, Roman castra were often sited on flat land, especially close to or on important nodes like river crossings or intersections of trade routes. The dimensions of the castra were often standard, with each of its four walls generally having a length of 660 metres (2,150 ft). Familiarity was the aim of such standardisation: soldiers could be stationed anywhere around the Empire, and orientation would be easy within established towns if they had a standard layout. Each would have the aforementioned decumanus maximus and cardo maximus at its heart, and their intersection would form the forum, around which would be sited important public buildings. Indeed, such was the degree of similarity between towns that Higgins states that soldiers "would be housed at the same address as they moved from castra to castra". Pompeii has been cited by both Higgins and Laurence as the best-preserved example of the Roman grid.

Outside of the castra, large tracts of land were also divided in accordance with the grid within the walls. These were typically 730 metres (2,400 ft) per side (called centuria) and contained 100 parcels of land (each called heredium). The decumanus maximus and cardo maximus extended from the town gates out towards neighbouring settlements. These were lined up to be as straight as possible, only deviating from their path due to natural obstacles that prevented a direct route.

While the imposition of only one town form regardless of region could be seen as an imposition of imperial authority, there is no doubting the practical reasoning behind the formation of the Roman grid. Under Roman guidance, the grid was designed for efficiency and interchangeability, both facilitated by and aiding the expansion of their empire.

=== Asia from the first millennium AD ===
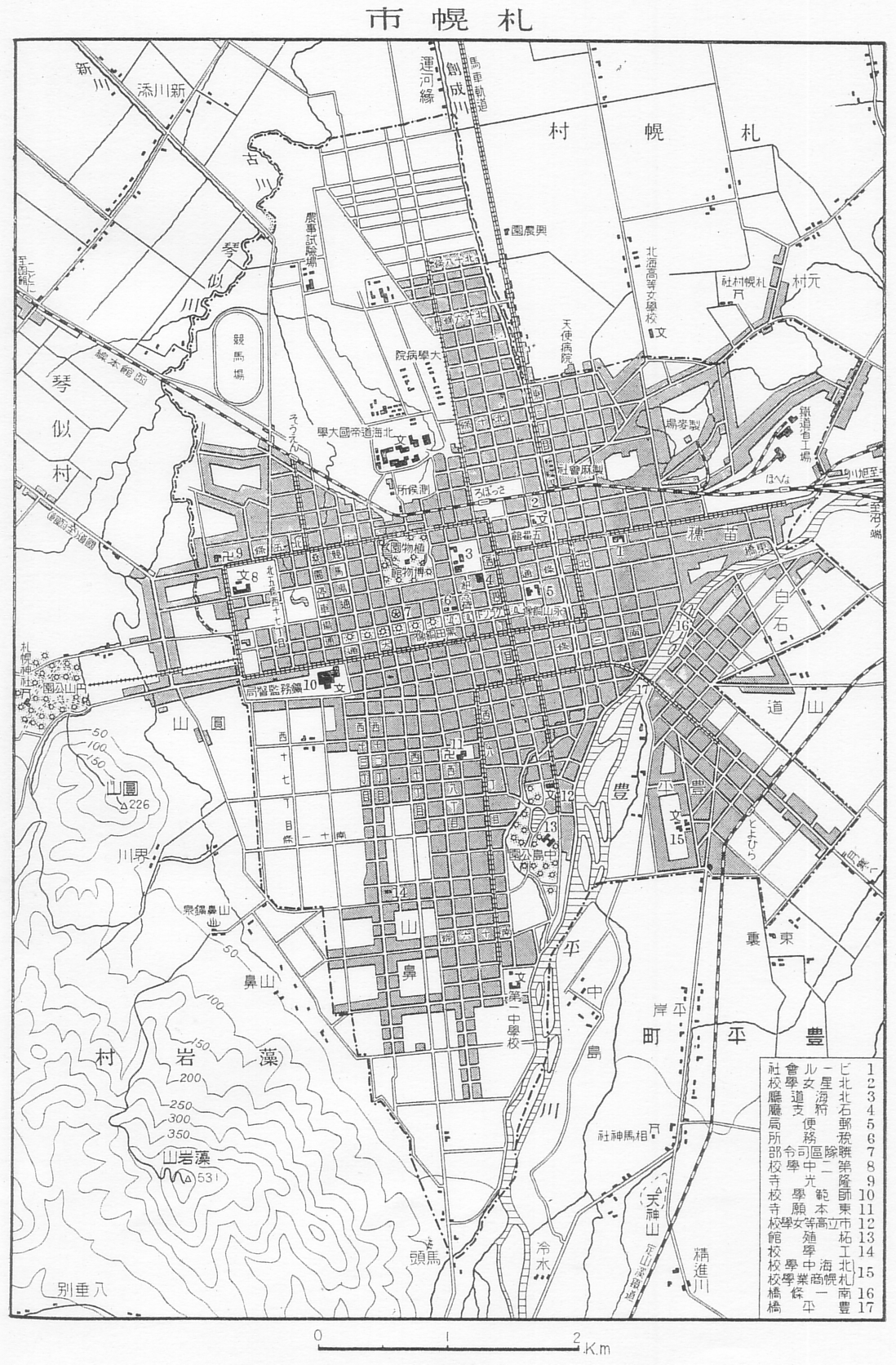
Grid blocks in Sapporo circa 1930, subdivisions are named after the numbered roads

As Japan and the Korean Peninsula became politically centralized in the 7th century AD, those societies adopted Chinese grid-planning principles in numerous locations. In Korea, Gyeongju, the capital of Unified Silla, and Sanggyeong, the capital of Balhae, adapted the Tang dynasty Chinese model. The ancient capitals of Japan, such as Fujiwara-Kyô (AD 694–710), Nara (Heijô-Kyô, AD 710–784), and Kyoto (Heian-Kyô, AD 794–1868) also adapted from Tang's capital, Chang'an. However, for reasons of defense, the planners of Tokyo eschewed the grid, opting instead for an irregular network of streets surrounding the Edo Castle grounds. In later periods, some parts of Tokyo were grid-planned, but grid plans are generally rare in Japan, and the Japanese addressing system is accordingly based on increasingly fine subdivisions, rather than grid-based house numbering.

The grid-planning tradition in Asia continued through the beginning of the 20th century, with Sapporo, Japan (est. 1868) following a grid plan under American influence.

=== Europe and its colonies (12th–17th centuries) ===
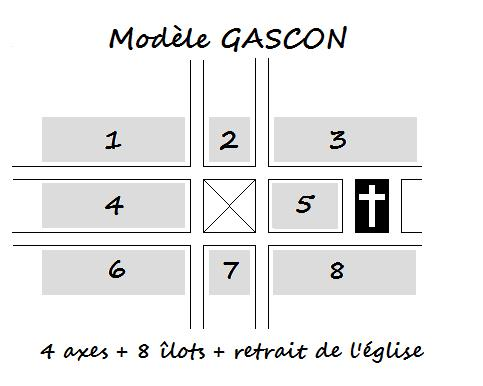
Bastide schema in Gascony

New European towns were planned using grids beginning in the 12th century, most prodigiously in the bastides of southern France that were built during the 13th and 14th centuries. Medieval European new towns using grid plans were widespread, ranging from Iberia to the Eastern Europe. Many were built on ancient grids originally established as Roman colonial outposts. In the British Isles, the planned new town system involving a grid street layout was part of the system of burgage. An example of a medieval planned city in The Netherlands is Elburg. Bury St Edmunds is an example of a town planned on a grid system in the late 11th century.

The Roman model was also used in Spanish settlements during the Reconquista of Ferdinand and Isabella. It was subsequently applied in the new cities established during the Spanish colonization of the Americas, after the founding of San Cristóbal de La Laguna (Canary Islands) in 1496. In 1573, King Philip II of Spain compiled the Laws of the Indies to guide the construction and administration of colonial communities. The Laws specified a square or rectangular central plaza with eight principal streets running from the plaza's corners. Hundreds of grid-plan communities throughout the Americas were established according to this pattern, echoing the practices of earlier Indian civilizations.

The baroque capital city of Malta, Valletta, dating back to the 16th century, was built following a rigid grid plan of uniformly designed houses, dotted with palaces, churches and squares.

The grid plan became popular with the start of the Renaissance in Northern Europe. In 1606, the newly founded city of Mannheim in Germany was the first Renaissance city laid out on the grid plan. Later came the New Town in Edinburgh and almost the entire city centre of Glasgow, and many planned communities and cities in Australia, Canada and the United States.

Derry, constructed in 1613–1618, was the first planned city in Ireland. The central diamond within a walled city with four gates was considered a good design for defence. The grid pattern was widely copied in the colonies of British North America.

=== Russia (18th century) ===
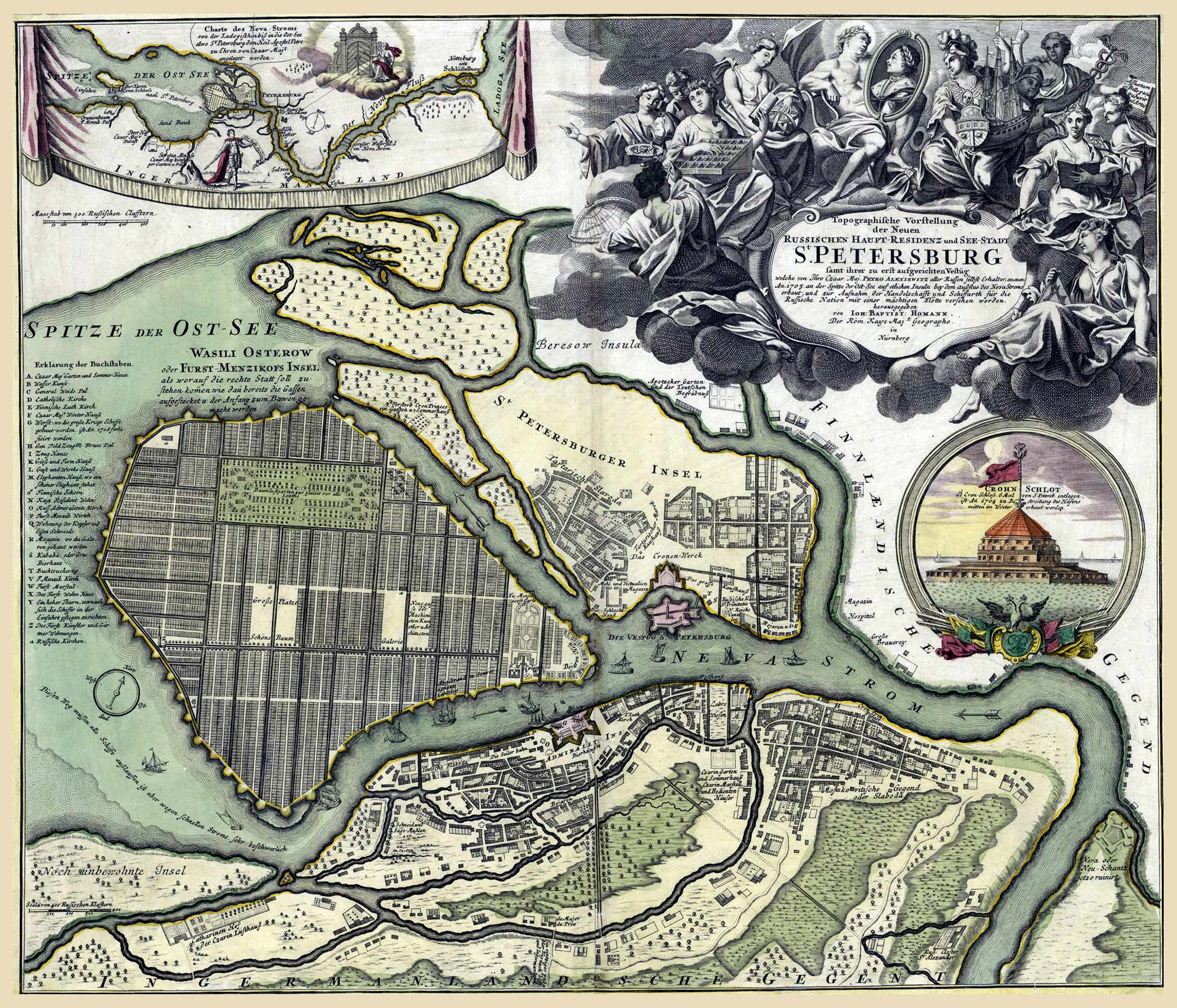
The map of St. Petersburg (1717). The grid of 'lines' and 'prospekts' is seen across the whole rectangular Vasilyevsky Island, while actually only the eastern part was built

In Russia the first planned city was St. Petersburg founded in 1703 by Peter I. Being aware of the modern European construction experience which he examined in the years of his Grand Embassy to Europe, the Czar ordered Domenico Trezzini to elaborate the first general plan of the city. The project of this architect for Vasilyevsky Island was a typical rectangular grid of streets (originally intended to be canals, like in Amsterdam), with three lengthwise thoroughfares, rectangularly crossed with about 30 crosswise streets.

The shape of street blocks on Vasilyevsky Island are the same, as was later implemented in the Commissioners' Plan of 1811 for Manhattan: elongated rectangles. The longest side of each block faces the relatively narrow street with a numeric name (in Petersburg they are called Liniya (Line)) while the shortest side faces wide avenues. To denote avenues in Petersburg, a special term prospekt was introduced. Inside the grid of Vasilyevsky Island there are three prospekts, named Bolshoi (Big), Sredniy (Middle) and Maly (Small) while the far ends of each line cross with the embankments of Bolshaya Neva and Smolenka rivers in the delta of the Neva River.

The peculiarity of 'lines' (streets) naming in this grid is that are each side of street has its own number, so one 'line' is a side of a street, not the whole street. The numbering is latently zero-based, however the supposed "zero line" has its proper name Kadetskaya liniya, while the opposite side of this street is called the '1-st Line'. Next street is named the '2-nd Line' on the eastern side, and the '3-rd Line' on the western side. After the reorganization of house numbering in 1834 and 1858 the even house numbers are used on the odd-numbered lines, and respectively odd house numbers are used for the even-numbered lines. The maximum numbers for 'lines' in Petersburg are 28–29th lines.

Later in the middle of the 18th century another grid of rectangular blocks with the numbered streets appeared in the continental part of the city: 13 streets named from the '1-st Rota' up to the '13-th Rota', where the companies (German: Rotte, Russian: рота) of the Izmaylovsky Regiment were located.

=== Early United States (17th–19th centuries) ===
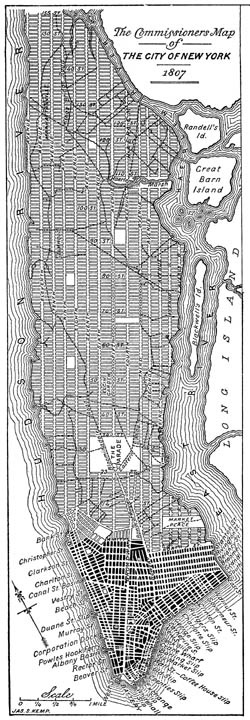
Commissioners' Plan of 1811 for Manhattan

A diagram of three U.S. city grids at the same scale showing the differences in dimensions and configuration

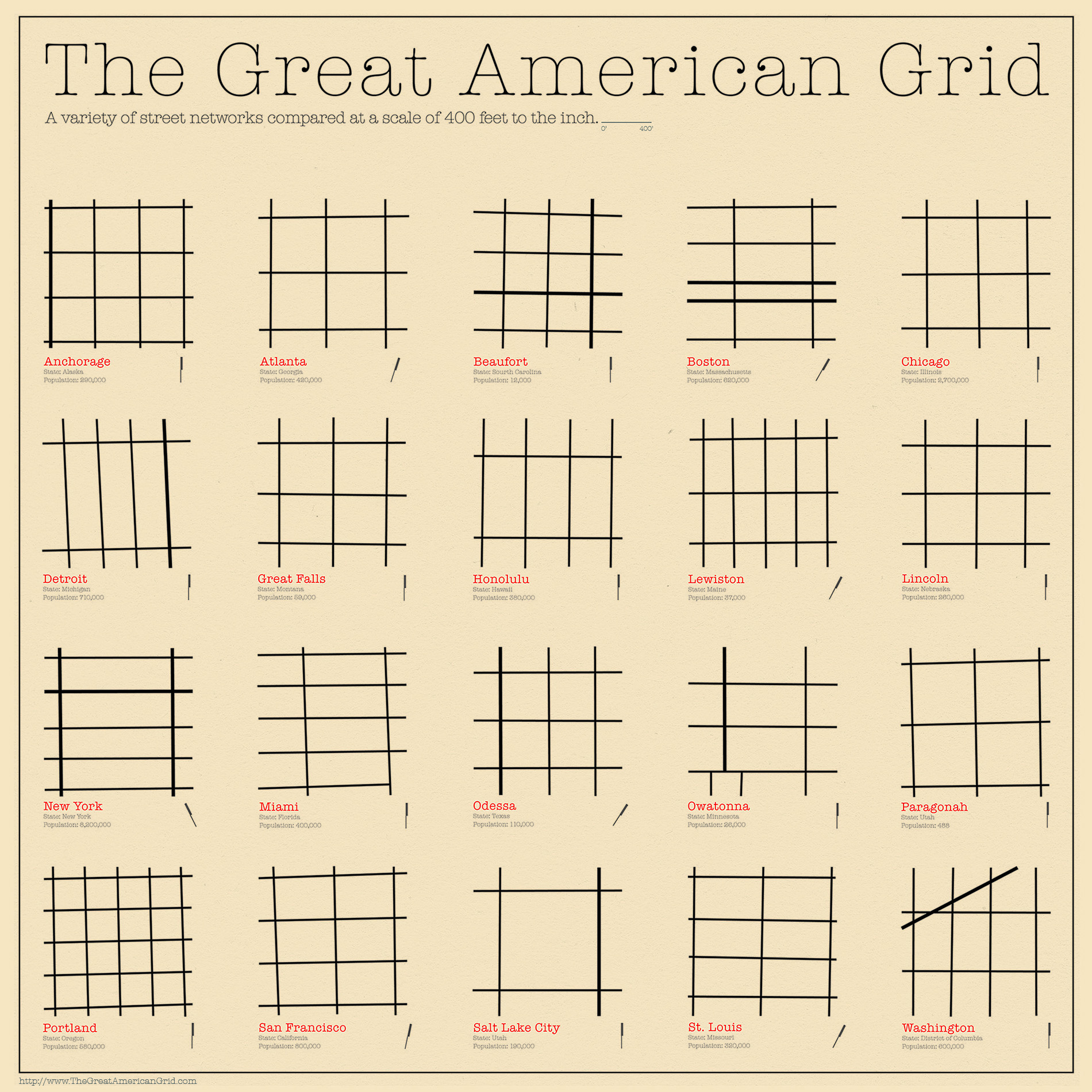
Twenty American grids compared at the same scale

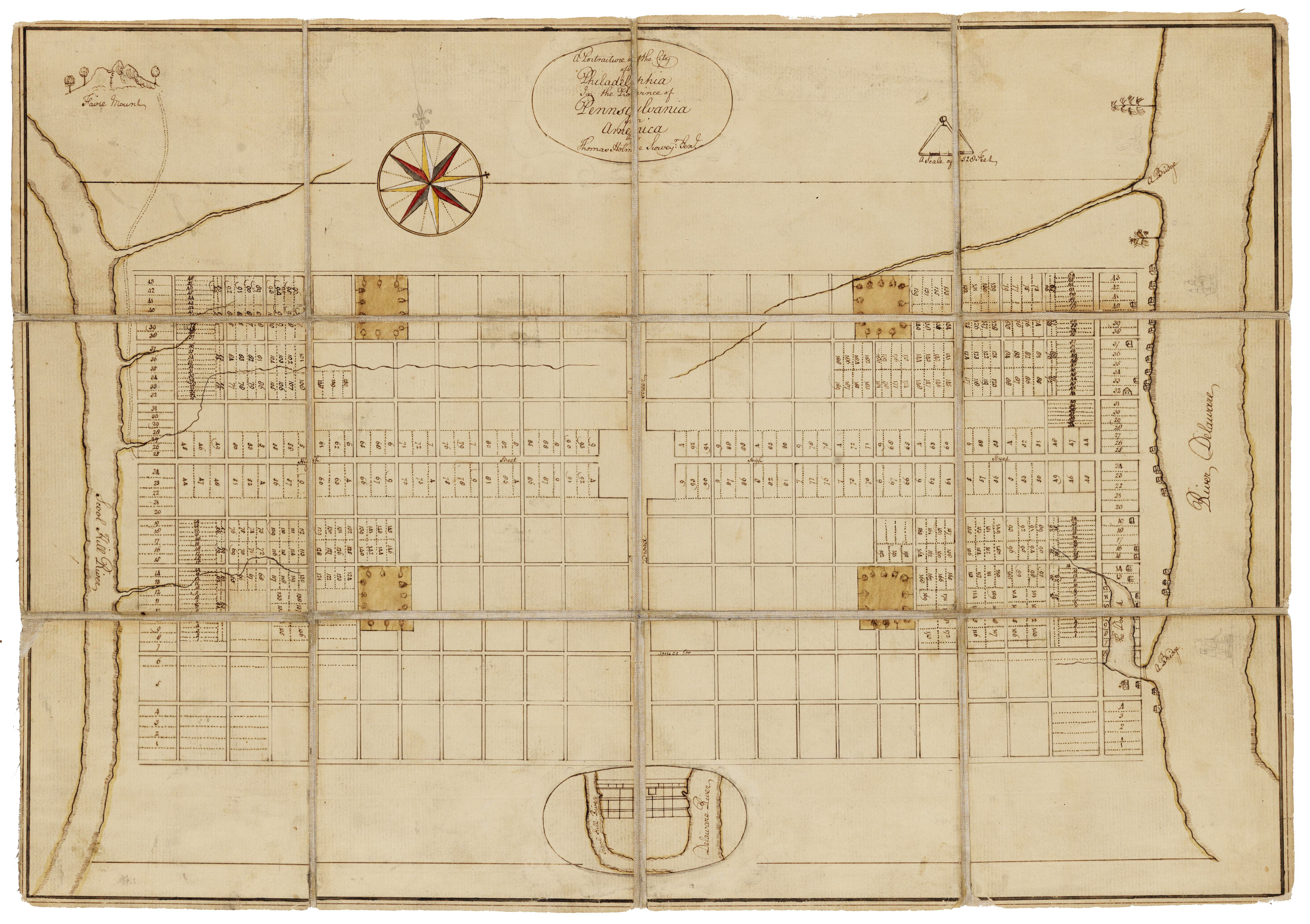
Map of the Original City of Philadelphia in 1682 by Thomas Holme

Many of the earliest cities in the United States, such as Boston, did not start with a grid system. However, even in pre-revolutionary days some cities saw the benefits of such a layout. New Haven Colony, one of the earliest colonies in America, was designed with a tiny 9-square grid at its founding in 1638. On a grander scale, Philadelphia was designed on a rectilinear street grid in 1682, one of the first cities in North America to use a grid system. At the urging of city founder William Penn, surveyor Thomas Holme designed a system of wide streets intersecting at right angles between the Schuylkill River to the west and the Delaware River to the east, including five squares of dedicated parkland. Penn advertised this orderly design as a safeguard against overcrowding, fire, and disease, which plagued European cities. Holme drafted an ideal version of the grid, but alleyways sprouted within and between larger blocks as the city took shape. As the United States expanded westward, grid-based city planning modeled on Philadelphia's layout would become popular among frontier cities, making grids ubiquitous across the country.

Another well-known grid plan is the one for New York City formulated in the Commissioners' Plan of 1811, a proposal by the state legislature of New York for the development of most of Manhattan above Houston Street.

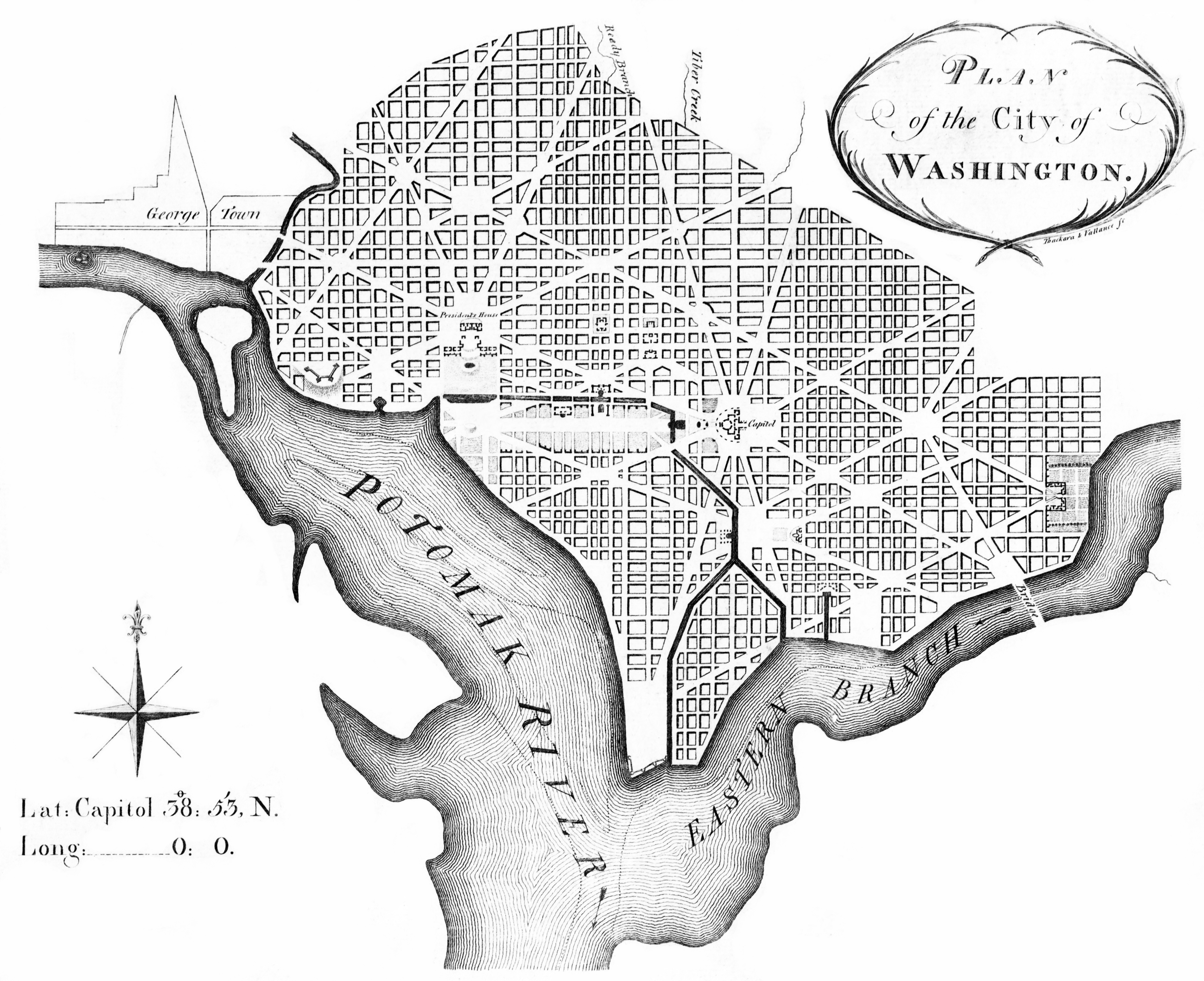
The L'Enfant Plan for Washington, D.C., set out a north–south, east–west grid pattern with diagonal streets radiating out from the U.S. Capitol.

Washington, D.C., the capital of the United States, was planned by French-American architect Pierre Charles L'Enfant. Under the L'Enfant plan, the original District of Columbia was developed using a grid plan that is interrupted by diagonal avenues, most famously Pennsylvania Avenue. These diagonals are often connected by traffic circles, such as Dupont Circle and Washington Circle. As the city grew, the plan was duplicated to cover most of the remainder of the capital. Meanwhile, the core of the city faced disarray and the McMillan Plan, led by Senator James McMillan, was adopted to build a National Mall and a parks system that remains the crown jewel of the city today.

Often, some of the streets in a grid are numbered (First, Second, etc.), lettered, or arranged in alphabetical order. Downtown San Diego uses all three schemes: north–south streets are numbered from west to east, and east–west streets are split between a lettered series running southward from A through L and a series of streets named after trees or plants, running northward alphabetically from Ash to Walnut. As in many cities, some of these streets have been given new names violating the system (the former D Street is now Broadway, the former 12th Avenue is now Park Boulevard, etc.); this has meant that 2nd, not 1st, is the most common street name in the United States.

An exception to the typical, uniform grid is the plan of Savannah, Georgia (1733), known as the Oglethorpe Plan. It is a composite, cellular city block consisting of four large corner blocks, four small blocks in between and a public square in the centre; the entire composition of approximately ten acres (four hectares) is known as a ward. Its cellular structure includes all the primary land uses of a neighborhood and has for that reason been called fractal. Its street configuration presages modern traffic calming techniques applied to uniform grids where certain selected streets become discontinuous or narrow, thus discouraging through traffic. The configuration also represents an example of functional shared space, where pedestrian and vehicular traffic can safely and comfortably coexist.

In the westward development of the United States, the use of the grid plan was nearly universal in the construction of new settlements, such as in Salt Lake City (1870), Dodge City (1872) and Oklahoma City (1890). In these western cities the streets were numbered even more carefully than in the east to suggest future prosperity and metropolitan status.

One of the main advantages of the grid plan was that it allowed the rapid subdivision and auction of a large parcel of land. For example, when the legislature of the Republic of Texas decided in 1839 to move the capital to a new site along the Colorado River, the functioning of the government required the rapid population of the town, which was named Austin. Charged with the task, Edwin Waller designed a fourteen-block grid that fronted the river on 640 acres (exactly 1 square mile; about 2.6 km^{2}). After surveying the land, Waller organized the almost immediate sale of 306 lots, and by the end of the year the entire Texas government had arrived by oxcart at the new site. Apart from the speed of surveying advantage, the rationale at the time of the grid's adoption in this and other cities remains obscure.

=== Early 19th century – Australasia ===
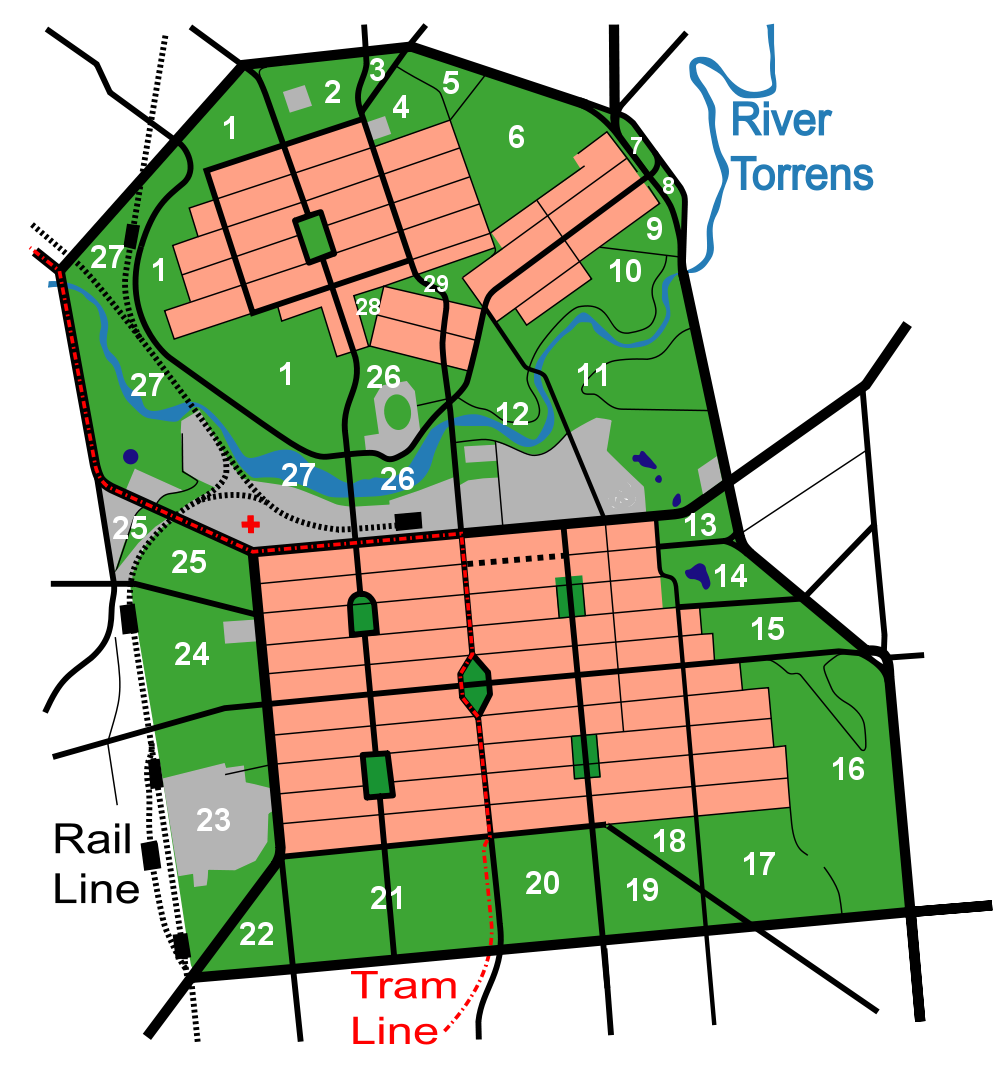
The city of Adelaide, South Australia was laid out in a grid, surrounded by gardens and parks.

In 1836 William Light drew up his plans for Adelaide, South Australia, spanning the River Torrens. Two areas south (the city centre) and north (North Adelaide) of the river were laid out in grid pattern, with the city surrounded by the Adelaide Park Lands.

Hoddle Grid is the name given to the layout of Melbourne, Victoria, named after the surveyor Robert Hoddle, who marked it out in 1837 establishing the first formal town plan. This grid of streets, laid out when there were only a few hundred settlers, became the nucleus for what is now a city of over 5 million people, the city of Melbourne. The unusual dimensions of the allotments and the incorporation of narrow 'little' streets were the result of compromise between Hoddle's desire to employ the regulations established in 1829 by previous New South Wales Governor Ralph Darling, requiring square blocks and wide, spacious streets and Bourke's desire for rear access ways (now the 'little' streets, for example Little Collins Street).

The city of Christchurch, New Zealand, was planned by Edward Jollie in 1850.

==== Town acre ====
The term "town acre" (often spelt with initial capital letters) may have originated with Edward Gibbon Wakefield who, in the 1830s, was involved in various schemes to promote the colonisation of South Australia and its capital, Adelaide, and, as founder of the New Zealand Company, the plans for Wellington, New Plymouth and Nelson. All of these towns were laid out on a grid plan, so it was easy to divide the land into acre plots of one chain by one furlong, 66 by 660 feet (20 by 201 m) (approximately 0.4 ha.), and these became known as town acres. Adelaide was divided into 1042 Town Acres. Maps showing the divisions of the town acres are available for Adelaide, Nelson, and Wellington.

=== Late 19th century to the present ===
Map of the original city plan of Barcelona by Cerdà.

The city blocks and streets of Barcelona as conceived by Ildefons Cerdà. The blocks include wide open spaces that continue across the street to adjacent blocks.

Ildefons Cerdà, a Spanish civil engineer, defined a concept of urban planning, based on the grid, that he applied to the Eixample of Barcelona. The Eixample grid introduced innovative design elements which were exceptional at the time and even unique among subsequent grid plans:

- a very large block measuring 113 by 113 m (371 by 371 ft), far larger than the old city blocks and larger than any Roman, Greek blocks and their mutations;
- a 20 m (66 ft) road width (right of way) compared with mostly 3 m in the old city;
- square blocks with truncated corners; and
- major roads, perpendicular and diagonal, measuring 50 m (160 ft) in width.

Cerda formulated these innovations in response to changing functional needs. As cities grew larger, through traffic, travel distance, noise, and pollution from carts became significant issues. Larger blocks with major perpendicular roads enables the creation of a quiet interior open space (60 m by 60 m) and allow ample sunlight and ventilation to its perimeter buildings; the rectilinear geometry, the wide streets and boulevards to sustain high mobility and the truncated corners to facilitate turning of carts and coaches and particularly vehicles on fixed rails. As buildings became taller, the new design also permitted a more natural sense of scale to the buildings from the street and reduced wind speeds.

In the early 1900s, urban planners such as New York architect Charles Lamb, who was one of the first to sketch out a city plan with a hexagonal grid, and Rudolf Muller, Austrian architect who iterated upon Lamb's hexagonal grid system, demonstrated their application and value to city grids. During the 1920s, Noulan Cauchon, a Canadian planner and engineer, further refined and optimized the hexagonal model—even showing how it can be integrated into existing cities. With growing concerns over vehicle flow, this model provided a reduction in collision points; from 16 to just 3 by reducing the 4-way intersection of a traditional orthogonal grid, to a 3-way intersection that allows for better sightline with its obtuse 120° angle. However, Thomas Adams who was "pivotal in making urban planning a separate profession and in codifying residential design practice" preferred square grids and suburban cul-de-sacs. Adam's rebutted Cauchon's work in his co-authored Harvard book: The Design of Residential Areas: Basic Considerations, Principles, and Methods (1934), modifying Cauchon's drawings to disfavour hexagonal grids, despite them being the most efficient grid model. This publishment received widespread attention, and led to the adoption of square grids in the downtown areas of most large American colonial cities.

These areas represent the original land dimensions of the founded city, generally around one square mile. Some cities expanded the grid further out from the centre, but maps also show that, in general, as the distance from the centre increases, a variety of patterns emerge in no particular discernible order. In juxtaposition to the grid, they appear random. These new patterns have been systematically classified and their design characteristics measured.

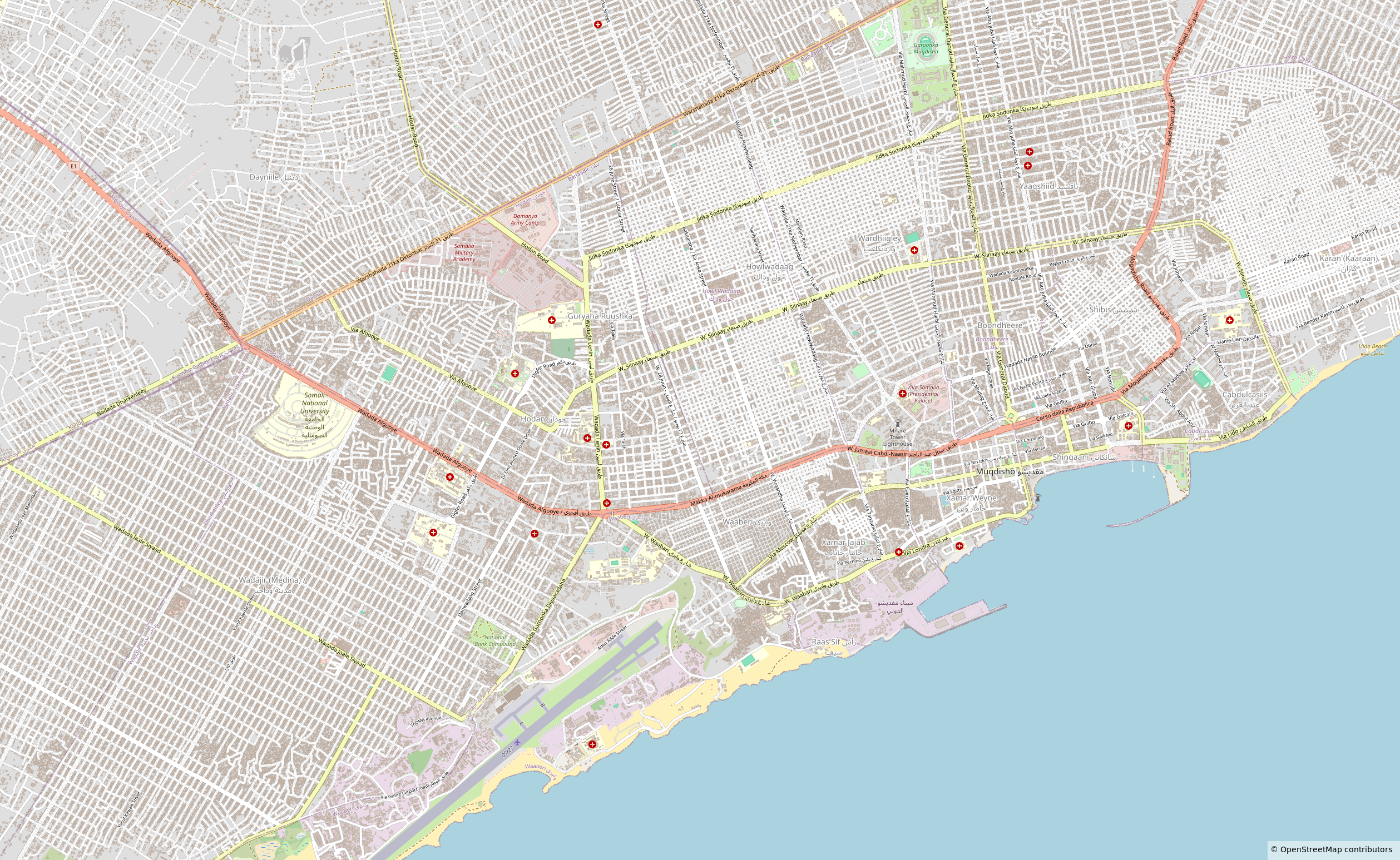
Map of old Mogadishu along the coast, and its grid-based suburbs inland

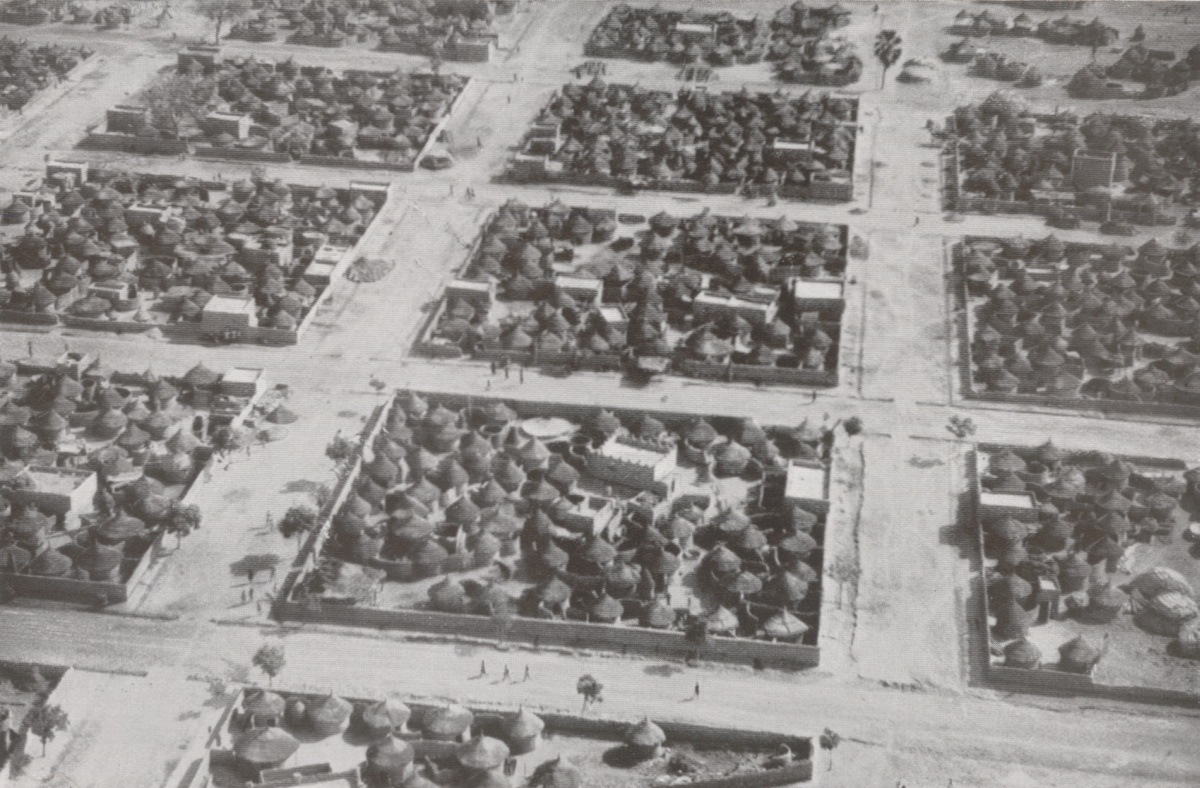
Ouagadougou (Burkina Faso, ex Upper Volta, Africa), 1930

A prominent 20th century urbanist, Lewis Mumford, severely criticized some of the grid's characteristics: "With a T-square and a triangle, finally, the municipal engineer could, without the slightest training as either an architect or a sociologist, 'plan' a metropolis, with its standard lots, its standard blocks, its standard street widths, in short, with its standardized comparable, and replaceable parts. The new gridiron plans were spectacular in their inefficiency and waste. By usually failing to discriminate sufficiently between main arteries and residential streets, the first were not made wide enough while the second were usually too wide for purely neighborhood functions... as for its contribution to the permanent social functions of the city, the anonymous gridiron plan proved empty."

In the 1960s, traffic engineers and urban planners abandoned the grid virtually wholesale in favor of a "street hierarchy". This is a thoroughly "asymmetric" street arrangement in which a residential subdivision—often surrounded by a noise wall or a security gate—is completely separated from the road network except for one or two connections to arterial roads. In a way, this is a return to medieval styles: as noted in Spiro Kostof's seminal history of urban design, The City Shaped, there is a strong resemblance between the street arrangements of modern American suburbs and those of medieval Arab and Moorish cities. In each case, the community unit at hand—the clan or extended family in the Muslim world, the economically homogeneous subdivision in modern suburbia—isolates itself from the larger urban scene by using dead ends and culs-de-sac.

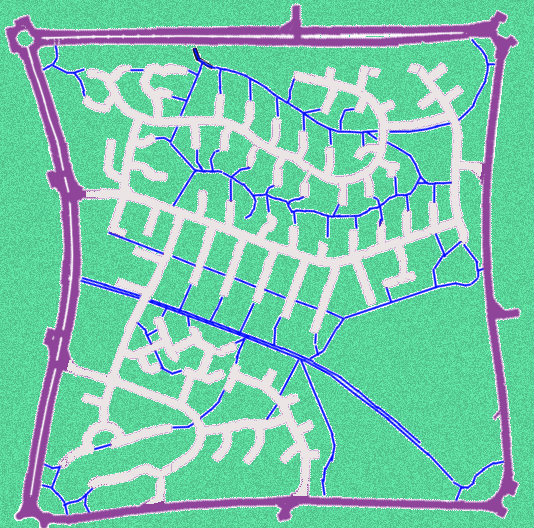
A one km^{2} sector in Milton Keynes framed by major roads in a grid configuration. The road network within the sector uses cul-de-sac streets complemented by bike and foot paths which connect the entire sector and beyond.

==== Milton Keynes ====
One famous grid system is in the British new town of Milton Keynes. In this planned city, which began construction in 1967, a system of ten "horizontal" (roughly east–west) and eleven "vertical" (roughly north–south) roads was used, with roundabouts at each intersection. The horizontal roads were all given names ending in 'way' and H numbers (for 'horizontal', e.g., H3 Monks Way). The vertical roads were given names ending in 'street' and V numbers (for 'vertical', e.g., V6 Grafton Street). Each grid road was spaced roughly one kilometre along from the next, forming squares of approximately one square kilometre. Each square and each roundabout was given its own name. The system provided very easy transport within the city, although it confused visitors who were unfamiliar with the system. The grid squares thus formed are far larger than the city blocks described earlier, and the road layouts within the grid squares are generally 'organic' in form – matching the street hierarchy model described above.

== Benefits and criticisms ==
=== Financial cost ===
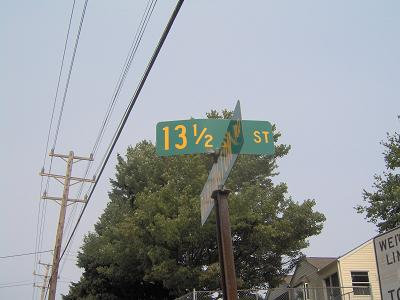
In a numbered grid system, adding an extra street can cause confusion

Street width, or right of way (ROW), influences the amount of land that is devoted to streets, which becomes unavailable for development and therefore represents an opportunity cost. The wider the street, the higher the opportunity cost. Street width is determined by circulation and aesthetic considerations and is not dependent on the pattern configuration. Any configuration can have wide or narrow streets.

Street length influences proportionately the number of street components that have to be constructed such as pavement, curbs and sidewalks, storm sewers and drains, light poles, and trees. The street length of a given area of development depends on the frequency at which streets occur which in turn depends on the length and width of a block. The higher the frequency of streets the longer is their total length. The smaller the block dimensions the higher the frequency of the streets. As the frequency of street increases so does the number of intersections. Intersections normally cost more than straight street length because they are labour-intensive and require street and traffic signage.

Pavement width influences the cost by affecting the amount of materials and labour required to provide a finished road surface. Pavement width is generally based on traffic engineering considerations and is not dependent on pattern configuration. As with the street width, any pattern can have wide or narrow pavements. Of all three factors that affect cost, street width, street length and pavement width, only street length is pattern dependent. An objective cost comparison would, therefore, rely on this variable with the full understanding that the other variables, though optional, can play a role.

Not only do these street dimension factors increase infrastructure costs and inhibit land utilization and by turn, affordability, but they also impact a city's economic productivity. "Street width plays a crucial role in shaping our perception of scale, influencing how distant or accessible destinations appear". Wider streets have less developable land within a square mile generating tax revenue (tax revenue falls) while having greater area of streets to maintain (expenses go up).

Traditional orthogonal grid patterns generally have greater street frequencies than discontinuous patterns. For example, Portland's block is 200 feet × 200 feet while Miletus' is half that size and Timgad's half again (see diagram). Houston, Sacramento and Barcelona are progressively bigger reaching up to four times the area of Portland's block. New York's 1811 plan (see above) has blocks of 200 feet (61 m). in width and variable lengths ranging from about 500 feet (150 m) to 900 feet (270 m). The corresponding frequency of streets for each of these block sizes affects the street length.

A simple example of a grid street pattern (see diagram) illustrates the progressive reduction in total street length (the sum of all individual street lengths) and the corresponding increase in block length. For a corresponding reduction of one, two, three and four streets within this 40-acre (16 ha) parcel, the street length is reduced from an original total of 12,600 feet (3,800 m) to 7,800 feet (2,400 m) linear feet, a 39% reduction. Simultaneously, block lengths increase from 200 × 200 feet to 1240 × 200 feet. When all five blocks have reached the ultimate size of 1,240 feet (380 m) four street lengths out of total eight have been eliminated. Block lengths of 1,000 feet (300 m) or larger rarely appear in grid plans and are not recommended as they hinder pedestrian movement (Pedestrianism, below). From the pedestrian perspective, the smaller the block is, the easier the navigation and the more direct the route. Consequently, the finer grids are preferred.

Patterns that incorporate discontinuous street types such as crescents and culs-de-sac have not, in general, regarded pedestrian movement as a priority and, consequently, have produced blocks that are usually in the 1,000 feet (300 m) range and often exceed it. As a result, street frequency drops and so does the total street length and, therefore, the cost. In general, it is not the street pattern per se that affects costs but the frequency of streets that it either necessitates or purposely incorporates.

An inherent advantage of the orthogonal geometry of a proper grid is its tendency to yield regular lots in well-packed sequences. This maximizes the use of the land of the block; it does not, however, affect street frequency. Any frequency of orthogonal streets produces the same packing effect. Orthogonal geometry also minimizes disputes over lot boundaries and maximizes the number of lots that could front a given street. John Randal said Manhattan's grid plan facilitated "buying, selling and improving real estate".

Another important aspect of street grids and the use of rectilinear blocks is that traffic flows of either pedestrians, cars, or both, only cross at right angles. This is an important traffic safety feature, since no one entering the intersection needs to look over their shoulder to see oncoming traffic. Any time traffic flows meet at an acute angle, someone cannot see traffic approaching them. The grid is thus a geometric response to our human physiology. It is very likely the original purpose of grid layouts comes from the Athenian Agora. Before the grid organization, markets were laid out randomly in a field with traffic approaches at odd angles. This caused carts and wagons to turn over due to frequent collisions. Laying out the market stalls into regularized rows at right angles solved this problem and was later built into the Athenian Agora and copied ever since.

=== Ecological features, rainwater absorption, and pollutant generation ===
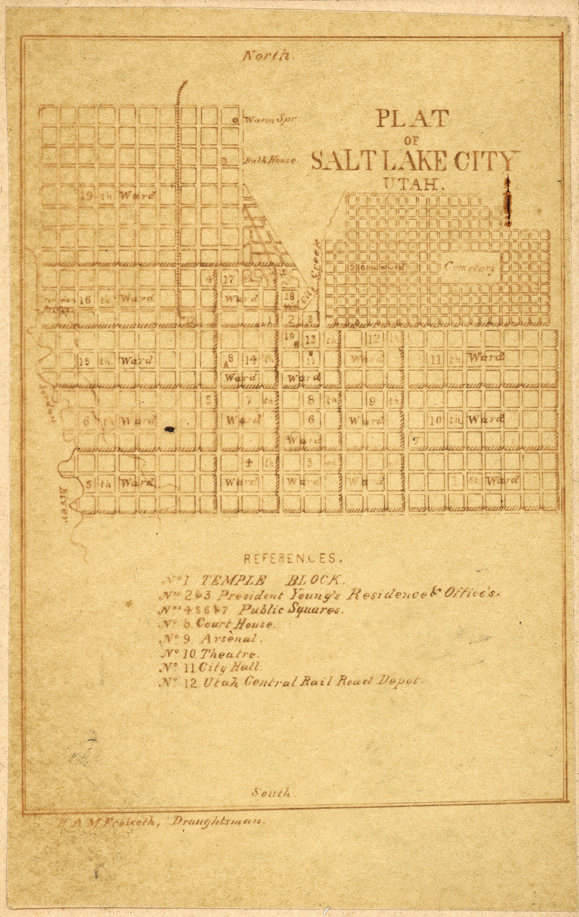
Surveyor's plan of Salt Lake City, circa 1870s – an example of a typical, uniform, square-grid street network

Typical uniform grids are unresponsive to topography. Priene's plan, for example, is set on a hill side and most of its north–south streets are stepped, a feature that would have made them inaccessible to carts, chariots and loaded animals. Many modern cities, such as San Francisco, Vancouver, and Saint John, New Brunswick, follow Priene's example. In a modern context, steep grades limit accessibility by car, and more so by bicycle, on foot, or wheelchair, particularly in cold climates.

The same inflexibility of the grid leads to disregarding environmentally sensitive areas such as small streams and creeks or mature woodlots in preference for the application of the immutable geometry. It is said of the New York City grid plan that it flattened all obstacles in its way. By contrast, recent discontinuous street patterns follow the configuration of natural features without disrupting them. The grid represents a rationalist, reductionist solution to a multifaceted issue.

The grid's inherent high street and intersection frequencies produce large areas of impermeable surfaces in the street pavement and the sidewalks. In comparison with recent networks with discontinuous street types, grids can be up to 30% higher in impermeable surfaces attributable to roads. The emerging environmental priority of retaining as much as 90% of rain water on site becomes problematic with high percentages of impermeable surfaces. And since roads constitute the largest share of the total impermeable surfaces of a development, the difficulty is compounded by the grid type of layout. For these reasons modern planners have attempted to modify the rigid, uniform, classic grid.

Some cities, notably Seattle, have devised means to improve a street's retention capacity. However, frequent intersections as they occur in a regular grid would pose an obstacle to their effective application.

A street network pattern can affect the production of pollutants by the amount of car travel that it necessitates and the speed at which cars can travel. The grid plan with its frequent intersections may displace a portion of the local car trips with walking or biking due to the directness of route that it offers to pedestrians. But, as long as cars are also allowed on those streets, it makes the same routes more direct for cars, which could be an enticement for driving. The potential car trip displacement would result in a reduction of pollutant emissions. The advantage of the intersection density for pedestrians, however, can have a contrary effect for cars due to its potential for reducing speeds. Low speeds below 20 mph (32 km/h) have a significantly higher coefficient of pollutant production than above 30 mph (48 km/h), though the coefficient after leveling off tends to increase gradually after 50 mph (80 km/h). This effect is accentuated with high traffic density in areas with commercial uses where speeds come to a crawl. Since the grid plan is non-hierarchical and intersections are frequent, all streets can be subject to this potential reduction of average speeds, leading to a high production of pollutants. Greenhouse and noxious gases can be detrimental to the environment and to resident health.

=== Social environment and security ===
In his seminal 1982 study on livable streets that was conducted in neighbourhoods with a grid, Donald Appleyard showed that social networking and street playing degraded as traffic increased on a street. His research provided the groundwork for traffic calming and for several initiatives such as living streets and Home Zones, all of which are aimed at improving a street's social milieu. The amount of traffic on a street depends on variables such as the population density of the neighbourhood, car ownership and its proximity to commercial, institutional or recreational edifices. Most importantly, however, it depends on whether a street is or could become a through road to a destination. As a through road, it could sustain unpredictable levels of traffic that may fluctuate during the day and increase over time.

A key characteristic of the grid pattern is that any and all streets are equally accessible to traffic (non-hierarchical) and could be chosen at will as alternative routes to a destination. Cut-through driving, or shortcutting, has been resisted by residents. Cities responded by making modifications to prevent it. Current recommended design practice suggests the use of 3-way intersections to alleviate it.

The geometry of the normal, open grid is evidently unsuitable for protecting or enhancing the social environment of a street from the negative influence of traffic. The scale of the block, as argued by Jane Jacobs—writer and activist, in her landmark The Death and Life of Great American Cities (1961), is "one of the four most important factors in generating diversity". Blocks longer than 400 feet (about 120 meters) disrupt the “intricate pools of fluid street use” that are necessary to support diverse economic and cultural interactions, and to maintain a “fabric of intimate economic cross-use”. Another key aspect is the overall street connectivity pattern, where smaller block sizes are crucial for enhancing accessibility, in addition to irregular block dimensions that emulate pedestrian movement. Bill Hillier, a professor of Architectural and Urban Morphology and his colleagues developed a “space syntax” model for street design, demonstrating that natural pedestrian movement—including trips to commercial areas—relies on the broader structure of the street grid. This supports Jacobs’ observation that block sizes directly influence economic activity and social interactions. Similarly, a 1972 ground-breaking study by Oscar Newman on a Defensible Space Theory described ways to improve the social environment and security of neighbourhoods and streets. In a practical application of his theory at Five Oaks, the neighbourhood's grid pattern was modified to prevent through traffic and create identifiable smaller enclaves while maintaining complete pedestrian freedom of movement. The positive outcome of these changes reinforces Appleyard's findings and the need to reduce or prevent through traffic on neighbourhood streets; a need that cannot be met with a typical, uniform, open grid.

The question of neighbourhood security has been a constant focus of research since Oscar Newman's work. New research has expanded the discussion on this disputed issue. A recent study did extensive spatial analysis and correlated several building, site plan and social factors with crime frequencies and identified subtle nuances to the contrasting positions. The study looked at, among others, dwelling types, unit density (site density) movement on the street, culs–de-sac or grids and the permeability of a residential area. Among its conclusions are, respectively, that flats are always safer than houses and the wealth of inhabitants matters, density is generally beneficial but more so at ground level, local movement is beneficial, but not larger scale movement, relative affluence and the number of neighbours have a greater effect than either being on a cul-de-sac or being on a through street. It also re-established that simple, linear cul-de-sac with good numbers of dwellings that are joined to through streets tend to be safe. As for permeability, it suggests that residential areas should be permeable enough to allow movement in all directions but no more. The overprovision of poorly used permeability is a crime hazard. The open, uniform grid could be seen as an example of undifferentiated permeability.

A 2007 study in California examined the amount of child play that occurred on the streets of neighbourhoods with different characteristics; grid pattern and culs-de-sac. The findings indicate that the open grid streets showed substantially lower play activity than the cul-de-sac street type. Culs-de-sac reduce perceived danger from traffic, and thereby encourage more outdoor play. It pointed the way toward the development of hybrid street network patterns that improve pedestrian movement but restrict cut-through driving. Similar studies in Europe and most recently in Australia found that children's outdoor play is significantly reduced on through roads where traffic is, or perceived by parents to be, a risk. As a result of this misperception of risk, children living in cul-de-sac communities are more likely to be killed by vehicles. This increased risk of death is due to multiple factors, including the families driving longer distances to reach their destinations, parents spending less time teaching their children to be as wary of traffic, and an increased risk of the parents accidentally driving over the children in their "safe" driveways and cul-de-sac streets.

Traditional street functions such as kids' play, strolling and socializing are incompatible with traffic flow, which the open, uniform grid geometry encourages. For these reasons, cities such as Berkeley, California, and Vancouver, British Columbia, among many others, transformed existing residential streets part of a grid plan into permeable, linked culs-de-sac. This transformation retains the permeability and connectivity of the grid for the active modes of transport but filters and restricts car traffic on the cul-de-sac street to residents only.

=== Pedestrian and bicycle movement ===
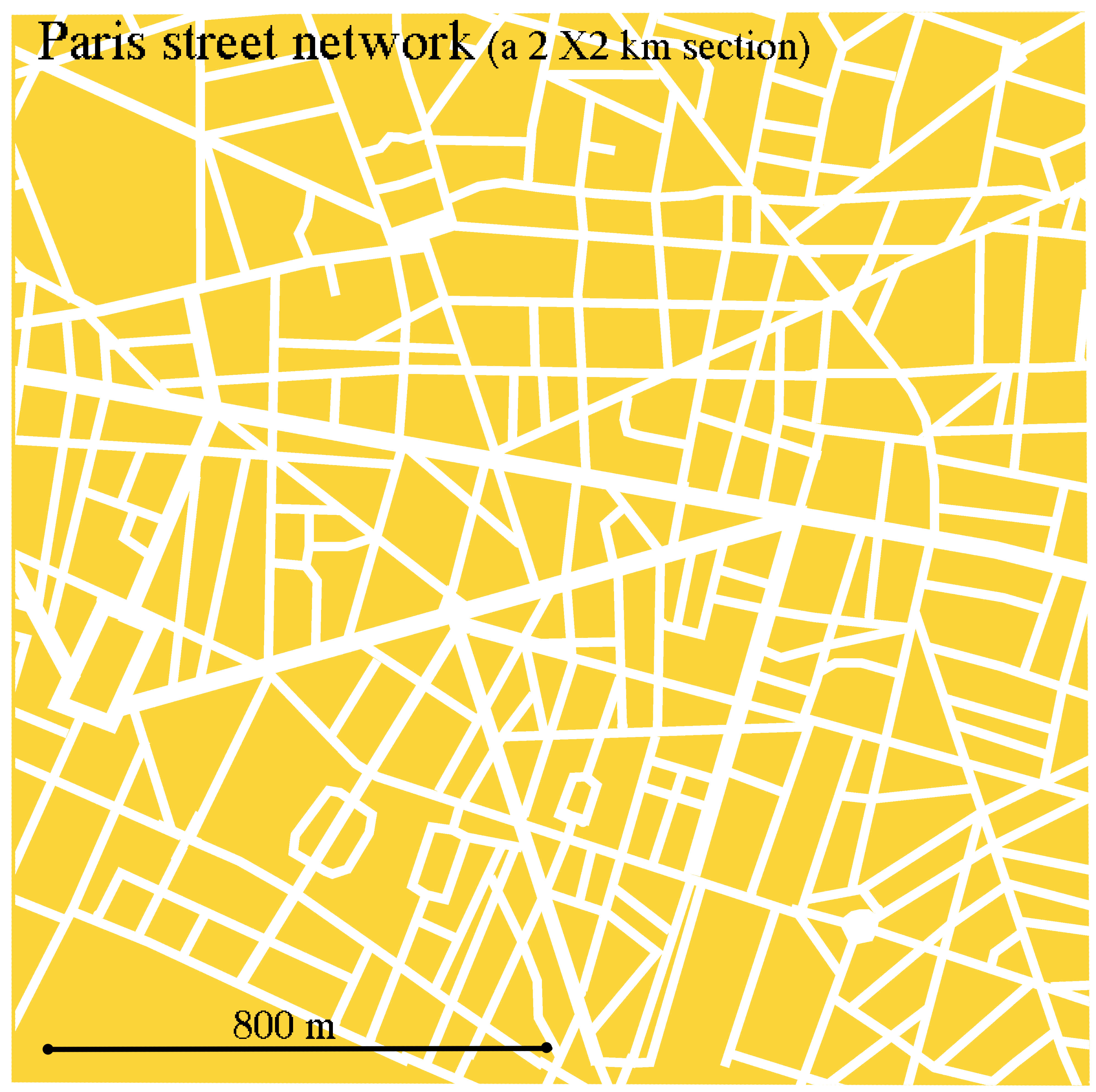
A 2×2 km square segment of the street network of Paris that often, and erroneously, is characterized as a grid. It shows the highly irregular city blocks and the range of street orientations, both common attributes of many historic cities

Street networks of old cities that grew organically, though admired for being picturesque, can be confusing for visitors but rarely for the original inhabitants (see plan). Similarly confusing to visitors are the plans of modern subdivisions with discontinuous and curvilinear streets. Change of street orientation, particularly when gradual or arbitrary, cannot be "mapped" in the mind. Impasses, crescents or cul-de-sacs frustrate the traveler especially when they are long, forcing an arduous retracing of steps.

Frequency of intersections, however, becomes also a disadvantage for pedestrians and bicycles. It disrupts the relaxed canter of walking and forces pedestrians repeatedly onto the road, a hostile, anxiety-generating territory. People with physical limitations or frailties, children and seniors for example, can find a regular walk challenging. For bicycles this disadvantage is accentuated as their normal speed is at least double that of pedestrians. Frequent stops negate the speed advantage and the physical benefit of bicycling and add to frustration. Intersections are not only unpleasant but also dangerous. Most traffic collisions and injuries occur at intersections and the majority of the injuries to pedestrians crossing with the right of way.

A dilemma arises from trying to meet important planning objectives when using the grid: pedestrianism, cost efficiency and environmental responsiveness. To serve pedestrians well, a rectangular configuration and high frequency of streets and intersections is the preferred route, which the orthogonal grid geometry provides. To reduce development costs and environmental impact, lower frequency of streets is the logical path. Since these two design objectives are contradictory a balance needs to be struck. Such balance has been achieved in leading modern projects such as Vauban, Freiburg and Village Homes, Davis. Both score high in pedestrian and bike mode share and, at the same time, in reducing negative development externalities. Their layout configurations represent a fusion of the classic grid plan with recent street network patterns.

Examining the issue of walkability, a recent comparison of seven neighbourhood layouts found a 43 and 32 percent increase in walking with respect to a grid plan and conventional suburban layout in a fused grid layout, which has greater permeability for pedestrians than for cars due to its inclusion of dedicated pedestrian paths. It also showed a 7 to 10 percent range of reduction in driving with respect to the remainder six neighbourhood layouts in the set, an environmental benefit.

=== Safety ===
Perceived and actual safety play a role in the use of the street. Perceived safety, though perhaps an inaccurate reflection of the number of injuries or fatalities, influences parents' decision to allow their children to play, walk or bike on the street. Actual levels of safety as measured by the total number of collisions and the number and severity of injuries are a matter of public concern. Both should inform the layout, if the street network is to achieve its optimum use.

Recent studies have found higher traffic fatality rates in outlying suburban areas than in central cities and inner suburbs with smaller blocks and more-connected street patterns.

An earlier study found significant differences in recorded accidents between residential neighborhoods that were laid out on a grid and those that included culs-de-sac and crescents. The frequency of accidents was significantly higher in the grid neighborhoods.

Two newer studies examined the frequency of collisions in two regional districts using the latest analytical tools. They investigated the potential correlation between street network patterns and frequency of collisions. In one study, cul-de-sac networks appeared to be much safer than grid networks, by nearly three to one. A second study found the grid plan to be the least safe by a significant margin with respect to all other street patterns.

A 2009 study suggests that land use patterns play a significant role in traffic safety and should be considered in conjunction with the network pattern. While all intersection types in general reduce the incidence of fatal crashes, four-way intersections, which occur regularly in a grid, increase total and injurious crashes significantly. The study recommends hybrid street networks with dense concentrations of T-intersections and concludes that a return to the 19th century gridiron is undesirable.

Stringent adherence to the grid plan can cause steep inclines since the topology of the land is not taken into account. This may be unsafe for drivers, pedestrians and bicycles since it is more difficult to control speed and braking, particularly in winter conditions.

=== Reconstruction and development ===
One of the greatest difficulties with grid plans is their lack of specialization, most of the important amenities being concentrated along the city's main arteries. Often grid plans are found in linear settlements, with a main street connecting between the perpendicular roads. However, this can be mitigated by allowing mixed use development so that destinations become closer to home. Many cities, especially in Latin America, still successfully retain their grid plans. Recently, planners in the United States and Canada have revisited the idea of reintroducing grid patterns to many cities and towns.

== See also ==
- City block
- Commissioners' Plan of 1811 (Manhattan street grid)
- Comprehensive planning
- Fused grid
- Land Ordinance of 1785 (United States)
- Street hierarchy
- Urban planning
- Urban structure
