= Secured by Design =

Police initiative in the UK

Secured by Design (SBD) is a police initiative in the UK that advises on the construction of buildings and development schemes to encourage the adoption of techniques or designs that are thought to discourage crime. SBD recommendations are included in the National Model Design Code and the programme incorporates training police officers as Designing Out Crime Officers (DOCOs), who are referred to in the National Planning Policy Framework, giving the initiative wide influence over British construction.

== History ==
Secured by Design was created in 1989 as a response to perceived failings of the estates built in the UK's postwar era, with two focuses: the vulnerability of certain construction methods, such as doors or glazing that were considered easy for burglars to bypass; and the wider design of housing estates or urban areas, which often incorporated pedestrian routes that were thought to create escape routes for criminals.

Secured by Design developed into a wide set of standards and design approaches, including on road and footpath layouts, lighting, street furniture, public or communal spaces (such as parks and playgrounds), fencing, planting, building positioning, and the materials used in construction. Urbanist Adam Greenfield says that Secured by Design is based on the principles of Defensible Space, developed in the 1970s by architect Oscar Newman. The scheme is administered by Police Crime Prevention Initiatives, a limited company set up by the ACPO. After the ACPO's dissolution, ownership was transferred to the London Mayor's Office for Policing and Crime. The Director of ACPO Secured by Design in 2012 described the goals of the scheme as "reducing crime and the fear of crime through a blend of design and realistic physical security", claiming that "independent research shows that SBD properties suffer 50% less burglary" with other benefits across other forms of crime and the fear of crime.

== Criticism ==
Some urbanists and planners have criticised the power the police have over construction and public spaces. Urbanist Phineas Harper described the impact of the scheme as "rooted in systemic prejudices rather than community-centred design principles" and noted Secured by Design's promotion of cul-de-sacs, which have been increasingly criticised by urban planners for encouraging sprawl and unsustainable living.

Architect Russell Curtis criticised the scheme's standards as "diametrically opposed to good placemaking", citing examples of his practice where Designing Out Crime Officers had called for public areas to be gated off and arguing that they had too much influence over local authority planners. Echoing these criticisms, Gloucester City Council decarbonisation lead Jon Burke argued that SBD's recommendation to remove trees and greenery may also harm communities and increase overall crime, citing studies by the Yale School of Public Health that found increasing urban tree canopy cover decreased violent and property crime.

Secured by Design has also been criticised for the removal of street furniture and planting, including a flower walkway in Southwark that was said to be blocking CCTV sight lines, benches and shrubs in parks in Ashford, and foot and bike paths in Horsham.

However, the UK police have defended Secured by Design's principles. Responding to Harper's criticisms, Matthew Scott, the Police and Crime Commissioner for Kent, claimed local residents in Ashford supported action to reduce anti-social behaviour. Jon Cole, the COO of Police Crime Prevention Initiatives argued that criticisms are based on misconceptions of the scheme, that cul-de-sacs are self-policing, and that overall "there is sometimes a little bit of inconvenience, but one which buys enormous amounts of safety."
