= William T. Bielby =

American sociologist

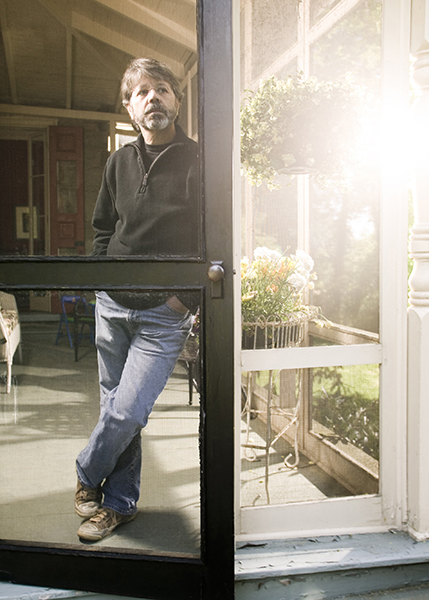
- William T. Bielby sociologist in 2006

William T. Bielby is a professor of sociology at the University of Illinois at Chicago and is Distinguished Research Scholar at the School of Sociology at the University of Arizona. He was the President of the American Sociological Association in 2002–2003. He studied electrical engineering at the University of Illinois at Urbana-Champaign, and earned his doctorate in sociology from the University of Wisconsin–Madison. He was on the faculty of University of California, Santa Barbara from 1977 to 2004, where he served as chair of the Department of Sociology for six years. From 2005 to 2007 he was Undergraduate Chair in the Department of Sociology at the University of Pennsylvania.

He has used the social framework analysis methodology to conclude that two aspects of Wal-Mart's culture, centralized personnel policy and managerial subjective decision making in the field, led to “decisions about compensation and promotion" to be vulnerable to gender bias.
