= Lisa Belkin =

American journalist and author

External videos
- Booknotes interview with Belkin on First, Do No Harm, April 25, 1993, C-SPAN

Lisa Belkin is an American journalist and author. She is best known for Show Me a Hero: A Tale of Murder, Suicide, Race, and Redemption (1992), about the public housing battles in Yonkers, New York. In 2015, the book was adapted to an HBO miniseries, starring actor Oscar Isaac and produced by David Simon.

Belkin has worked for The New York Times, HuffPost, and Yahoo News, as its chief national correspondent. She hosted a radio show on XM, an outgrowth of her "Life's Work" column.

Belkin is an adjunct assistant professor at Columbia University's Graduate School of Journalism.

== Reception ==
Belkin's first book, First, Do No Harm: The Dramatic Story of Real Doctors and Patients Making Impossible Choices at a Big-City Hospital, was a New York Times 1993 Notable Book of the Year.

Show Me a Hero (1999) received positive reviews. Publishers Weekly wrote that it was a "vivid slice of urban politics, racial tension and the difficulties inherent in realizing the American dream." Kirkus Reviews declared it a "riveting policy chronicle and cautionary tale that illustrates the urgency of rethinking our public housing policy." The New York Times praised Belkin for maintaining a reportorial objectivity.

== Books ==
- First, Do No Harm: The Dramatic Story of Real Doctors and Patients Making Impossible Choices at a Big-City Hospital (1993)
- Show Me a Hero: A Tale of Murder, Suicide, Race, and Redemption (1999)
- Life's Work: Confessions of an Unbalanced Mom (2002)
- Tales from the Times (2004), editor
- Genealogy of a Murder: Four Generations, Three Families, One Fateful Night (2023)
