= Show Me a Hero =

American 2015 television series

- Genre: Drama
- Based on: Show Me a Hero by Lisa Belkin
- Written by: David Simon; William F. Zorzi
- Directed by: Paul Haggis
- Starring: Oscar Isaac; Bob Balaban; Jim Belushi; Jon Bernthal; Dominique Fishback; Ilfenesh Hadera; LaTanya Richardson Jackson; Catherine Keener; Terry Kinney; Alfred Molina; Natalie Paul; Peter Riegert; Carla Quevedo; Winona Ryder
- Ending theme: "When the People Find Out" by Steve Earle
- Composer: Nathan Larson
- Country of origin: United States
- Original language: English
- No. of episodes: 6

Production
- Executive producers: David Simon; William F. Zorzi; Paul Haggis; Nina Kostroff Noble; Gail Mutrux
- Production locations: Yonkers, New York; Puerto Rico
- Cinematography: Andrij Parekh
- Editors: Jo Francis; Kate Sanford
- Camera setup: Single-camera
- Running time: 56–71 minutes
- Production companies: Blown Deadline Productions; Pretty Pictures; HBO Miniseries

Original release
- Network: HBO
- Release: August 16 – August 30, 2015

Show Me a Hero is a 2015 American miniseries based on the 1999 nonfiction book of the same name by former New York Times writer Lisa Belkin about Yonkers mayor (1987–89) Nick Wasicsko. Like the book, the miniseries details a white middle-class neighborhood's resistance to a federally mandated scattered-site public housing development in Yonkers, New York, and how the tension of the situation affected the city as a whole.

The miniseries was written by David Simon and journalist William F. Zorzi, with whom Simon worked at The Baltimore Sun and on the HBO series The Wire. It was directed by Paul Haggis. Six episodes were ordered by HBO; the miniseries premiered on August 16, 2015.

The name of both the show and the book that it is based upon comes from an F. Scott Fitzgerald quote: "Show me a hero and I will write you a tragedy."

== Background ==
The story is set between 1987 and 1994 in Yonkers, New York, a city north of New York City in Westchester County, and focuses on efforts to desegregate public housing. Federal judge Leonard B. Sand ruled against Yonkers and issued a desegregation order, mandating that public housing for 200 units—possibly scattered-site public housing ("SSPH"), which became the example of new public housing—be built on the middle-class, mostly white, east side of Yonkers. By 1988, the city had already spent $11 million in legal fees fighting against the order, including a failed effort to appeal to the Supreme Court of the United States. The case and resulting politics resulted in national focus on issues of race, class, and housing. Mayor Nick Wasicsko ran on the platform opposing the judge's order, but before taking office, in the face of the issue being supported by a federal appeals court, became an advocate for desegregation in Yonkers. Wasicsko and the city councillors who supported him worked out a plan to meet the court order, using the SSPH system to build the 200 homes at eight different sites of only 25 homes each, spread across a city with more than 10,000 homes.

Despite this, four councillors – a majority – refused to vote to uphold the law, consistently opposing any limited desegregation. For refusing to follow the court order, the city of Yonkers was crippled by heavy, possibly bankrupting fines—estimated to be close to $1 million a day from a compounded charge that started at $100 a day. Basic services stopped, and parks and libraries were shuttered, with 630 city workers facing mandatory layoffs in order to maintain enough money for police and fire services. There were ongoing protests, including Wasicsko and others receiving death threats, such as envelopes containing bullets, at least once with a note that “You won’t see the next one.” Wasicsko was forced to comply. The suit was finally settled in May 2007.

In addition to the Yonkers City Council members and other local politicians, two groups took opposing sides on the issue: Save Yonkers Federation, led by Jack O'Toole, who were anti-desegregation and voted to defy the federal order, and the Citizens and Neighbors Organized to Protect Yonkers ("Canopy"), who supported the court order, wanting to end the crippling fines. New York Secretary of State Gail Shaffer was appointed by then governor Mario Cuomo as the chair of the Yonkers Emergency Financial Control Board, which was in charge of the city's finances in 1988 as the fines reduced all city services and the city became bankrupt. The Housing Education Relocation Enterprise (H.E.R.E.) was a community-based organization that supported the tenants moving into the scattered-site public housing.

Yonkers hired city planner Oscar Newman, originator of the defensible space theory, to work with the United States Department of Housing and Urban Development on the housing plan. Newman's theories emphasized the value of small groups of townhouses with yards, rather than multi-story apartment blocks, to provide a sense of ownership for the low-income residents, while being immersed in the activities and culture of middle-class neighborhoods. The challenges of the existing projects were shown through the lives of a number of families living there.

== Cast ==
- Oscar Isaac as Nick Wasicsko, former police officer, then Yonkers City Council member running for election to be mayor of Yonkers, eventually the youngest big-city mayor (1987–89) in the nation
- Carla Quevedo as Nay Noe Wasicsko, City Hall staffer, Mayor Wasicsko's wife
- Peter Riegert as architect and city planner Oscar Newman, originator of the defensible space theory
- Jim Belushi as Angelo R. Martinelli, a six-term Mayor of Yonkers who is Wasicsko's opponent in the election to be mayor of Yonkers
- Alfred Molina as Henry J. "Hank" Spallone, Yonkers City Council member who was passionately anti-housing, who became mayor of Yonkers based on his refusal to follow the desegregation order
- Winona Ryder as Vinni Restiano, Yonkers City Council president who advocated for integration
- Bob Balaban as Judge Leonard B. Sand, who ordered desegregation
- Jim Bracchitta as Nicholas Longo, Yonkers City Council member who was outspoken in his criticism of the federal ruling
- Allan Steele as Edward Fagan, Yonkers City Council member who was outspoken in his criticism of the federal ruling
- Terry Kinney as Peter Smith, the Yonkers Housing Authority director
- Jon Bernthal as Michael H. Sussman, civil rights attorney and former federal prosecutor; represents the local NAACP chapter
- Michael Stahl-David as James Surdoval, Wasicsko's political consultant
- Catherine Keener as Mary Dorman, an East Yonkers homeowner who was part of the Save Yonkers Federation
- Bruce Altman as Buddy Dorman, Mary's husband
- Ilfenesh Hadera as Carmen "Alma" Febles, a single mother from the Dominican Republic
- LaTanya Richardson Jackson as Norma O'Neal, a home health aid living in the projects, who is struggling with losing her sight
- McKinley Belcher III as Dwayne Meeks, Norma O'Neal's son and a minivan manufacturer
- Natalie Paul as Doreen Henderson, a young woman born in public housing but raised in the suburbs, who is drawn back to the housing projects where her life spirals out of control just as the crack epidemic intensifies
- Dominique Fishback as Billie Rowan, a troubled teenager who lives in the projects and gets involved with a local petty criminal
- Melanie Nicholls-King as Janet Rowan, Billie Rowan's mother
- Clarke Peters as Robert Mayhawk, neighborhood consultant who runs the Housing Education Relocation Enterprise (H.E.R.E.), to assist with the integration of scattered-site public housing
- Jenna Stern as Gail Shaffer, Secretary of State of New York, chairs the Yonkers Emergency Financial Control Board

== Production ==
=== Development ===
Simon said that Gail Mutrux (who runs the production company Pretty Pictures), a producer Simon knew from working with her on Homicide, had sent him a copy of Belkin's book. In 2001, Simon sent Zorzi, who at that time was assistant city editor at The Baltimore Sun, a copy of the book, which he was taking to HBO as a potential project. In 2002, Zorzi quit his job at The Sun and began working on this miniseries, on what became a long-term project.

The story was in development for over a decade, with co-writer Zorzi working on the passion project during that time, even as he and Simon were working on The Wire. HBO had an option on the book, but it spent years in script re-writes with Zorzi as Simon and Zorzi were both busy working on other projects.

Simon says that Mayor Nick Wasicsko's story is what drives the narrative, and that if the character's arc wasn't right, the series would fail. Simon calls Isaac the key to making it work. Wasicsko's wife, Nay Wasicsko-McLaughlin, who worked at City Hall during the time of the conflict, was a consultant on the show. Wasicsko-McLaughlin met with Isaac, which Isaac said was vital to the story.

Simon refers to Yonkers as one of the first locations of the birth and growth of scattered site housing and the integration of architect and city planner Oscar Newman's work on defensible space theory and his 1972 work "Creating Defensible Space," and that this story went on to impact methods of public housing programs on a national scale. Yonkers was the very public staging ground.

Director Paul Haggis states that when he heard about Simon's project, he told his agents to agree his participation, even without him reading the script. Once he had read it, he asked to direct not one or two episodes, as requested, but the entire series. This was the first time that Haggis, who typically both writes and directs his pieces, didn't write the material himself. He said he did this because it was so important to him to work with Simon.

=== Filming ===
The miniseries began shooting on October 1, 2014, and wrapped shooting on location January 25, 2015. Show Me a Hero made use of primary locations in Yonkers, New York, including the William A. Schlobohm Houses public housing projects, which was the subject of a July 2012 FBI investigation of drugs and firearm trafficking by a gang called the Strip Boyz. The Schlobohm Houses were one of the examples of a 1980 federal case – initially started in 1979 by the Carter Justice Department – then brought as a friend of the court case by a local NAACP chapter who sued the city of Yonkers with claims of segregation by the city, where the poorest residents were forced into living in the western part of town. The claim was that out of a city of almost 200,000 people with an area of approximately 21 square miles, that almost all non-white residents lived in 7,000 units of low income housing within the space of 1 square mile, in public housing that was located on the west side of Saw Mill River Parkway. The high concentration was the result of years of concentrated 40+ year old racial covenants prohibiting non-whites from living east of the Parkway.

Another Yonkers location was The Grinton I. Will branch of the Yonkers Public Library, where scenes of town gatherings were shot. The Cottage Place Gardens was used to substitute for the garden-style Mulford Gardens public housing project, as it has since been torn down. Some scenes were also shot at the Yonkers City Hall, within the Yonkers City Council Chambers where those actual events took place. Additionally, Haggis said that Mary Dorman's house was the actual location. Additional Yonkers locations used were The Department of Buildings at 87 Nepperhan Avenue and Oakland Cemetery. Scenes portraying the Dominican Republic were shot in Puerto Rico.

Working with the show's art department, graffiti artist Chris Capuozzo, with assistance of his photographer wife Denise Ranallo Capuozzo, who documented the graffiti in Yonkers during the time of the show, created temporary reproductions of period graffiti at the Schlobohm Houses and on Palisade Avenue.

=== Music ===
The show makes an extensive use of Bruce Springsteen music, with Springsteen's music often appearing during scenes that feature Wasicsko. The scenes in the housing projects incorporate period hip hop and rap by acts like Digable Planets and Public Enemy. Steve Earle's song, "When The People Find Out," from his 1990 album The Hard Way, is used in the closing credits. In most of Simon's other works, he has made use of diegetic sound – music that is incorporated within the scenes in a practical way (i.e., musicians playing music, boom boxes playing). In Show Me a Hero, Simon used music to cue the main character Wasicsko with a protagonist's aural identity that has elements of emotion conveyed by Springsteen's early music. The show used a total of 12 tracks by Springsteen.

=== Themes ===
Creator Simon said the appeal of the story was a focus on the disintegration of American politics and its corrosive dysfunctional nature in urban cities. Simon wrote that the series "...addresses class and racial segregation in our society, is more about our calcified political processes than directly relevant to the core grievances underlying current events." Simon said that the show depicts a city that is paralyzed by both fear (of integration) and money (valuations of real estate properties). He saw the story as allegorical of current America with refusal to share and the collapse of civilized behavior (with rage and fury quickly fracturing a city) due to the hyper-segregation of the poor in large WWII era high rise housing projects — ironically not the proposed scattered-site town houses that were actually being mandated.

Regarding the impetus for the choice of the shows he makes: in an interview on Slate, Simon referred to the concept of reportorial instinct, which comes from the efforts by journalists to create new discussion points that are centered upon issues of societal friction; with Show Me a Hero, Simon's methodical instinct is to focus on these. The idea is not part of a larger whole, a bigger picture, with each of his shows taking up real estate within that vision; it is both disparate and less organized than a global overview. He is not trying to duplicate The Wire, he's trying to tell a new story here.

== Release ==
=== Broadcast ===
The miniseries premiered in Canada on HBO Canada on August 16, 2015 – airing concurrently with the American broadcast. It premiered in Australia and the United Kingdom on August 17, 2015, on Showcase and Sky Atlantic, respectively. The miniseries was released on Blu-ray and DVD on February 2, 2016.

=== Episodes ===
In the United States, HBO broadcast the miniseries in 2-hour blocks on consecutive Sunday nights.

No.	Title	Directed by	Written by	Original release date	U.S. viewers (millions)
1–2	"Parts 1 & 2"	Paul Haggis	William F. Zorzi & David Simon	August 16, 2015	0.443
3–4	"Parts 3 & 4"	Paul Haggis	Story by : William F. Zorzi & David Simon; Teleplay by : William F. Zorzi	August 23, 2015	0.397
5–6	"Parts 5 & 6"	Paul Haggis	William F. Zorzi & David Simon	August 30, 2015	0.426

== Reception ==
=== Critical response ===
Show Me a Hero received critical acclaim from reviewers although U.S. cable original programming viewership was low. The review aggregator website Rotten Tomatoes reports a 96% approval rating with an average rating of 8.6/10 based on 54 reviews. The website's consensus reads, "Show Me a Hero is an impressively crafted period drama whose timely themes prove as absorbing as its engaging, compassionately drawn characters." On Metacritic, it has a score of 85 out of 100 based on 33 reviews. Tim Goodman of The Hollywood Reporter cited the strong storytelling as making the unsexy story rewarding, with a commendably even focus on both racism as well as the problems of systemic bias of public housing systems. Ginia Bellafante of The New York Times focused on the relevance to current day issues of race and economics.

Oscar Isaac received universal praise. Alan Sepinwall from HitFix cited his performance as being especially strong, describing him as compulsively watchable even during long scenes with a lot of dialogue, while Daniel Fienberg of The Fien Print said Isaac is the key to the story and is compelling, inhabiting his character fully. Sepinwall also said the writers did an excellent job of illustrating the conflict, which in its essence is not compelling, but in this depiction, becomes great. Fienberg cites the somewhat dry nature of the source material, and laughingly embraced what he called the "perversely uncommercial" nature of the show. Brian Lowry from Variety also commended Isaac's central role. Emily Nussbaum of The New Yorker calls Isaac's "a star performance agile enough to elevate scenes that might veer into agitprop."

Of the supporting cast, Catherine Keener drew critics' attention most positively. David Wiegand wrote for the San Francisco Chronicle, "Keener makes Dorman the touchstone of the story, as she constructs an ordinary woman whose values and beliefs are largely unexamined and derive from a lack of exposure to alternative ways of thinking. At heart, she is not an evil person, just fearful of what she doesn’t know. Her moment of enlightenment is so beautifully written and performed, the scene should be preserved as an example of absolute perfection ... Keener’s is only one of the truly great performances that make 'Hero' compelling". Nussbaum also praised Keener's performance, writing that she plays her with "warm humility", while for The Wrap Mark Peikert said that "Keener brings every scene she’s in to life".

Jacqueline Cutler of the New York Daily News cited the portrayals of the four women who are the focal points of the story, noting the strength of LaTanya Richardson Jackson's performance. Matt Zoller Seitz from Vulture opined that the supporting characters are the heart of the story and establish the resonance that careful viewers of Simon's show will find rewarding. NPR's David Bianculli calls the show nuanced, requiring focus and attention but worth the effort. Andy Greenwald from Grantland notes Simon has created a show that is both brilliant and vibrant despite being absurdly uncommercial. In comparison to the last two Simon produced shows, that had more of a downbeat feel, Greenwald sees this show being a return to form, as being both powerfully compelling as well as great entertainment. Greenwald also commends Haggis for his excellent direction throughout.

Detractors included Jeff Simon (no relation) of The Buffalo News, who cited Peter Riegert's facial hair choice – comparing it unfavorably to Horace Greeley – and leveling complaints of the choice of actors who are known for chewing the scenery. Other issues were the tone of the piece as well as the lack of drama. This critic acknowledged that he hadn't watched all episodes that were provided to critics before air dates. NPR TV critic Eric Deggans felt the show was too long, and called it slow.

The New York Times featured a discussion between Simon and Senator Cory Booker, drawing parallels between Booker's family's experience growing up in New Jersey where his family was the only black family – and had to take difficult measures to buy their house – and the situation in Yonkers, as well as comparable historical and current scenarios today [2015]. In 1969, to move into town, Booker's family went to Harrington Park, New Jersey's Fair Housing Council represented by a Caucasian couple to break the social covenants of the town housing market.

=== Awards and nominations ===
Year	Award	Category	Recipients	Result	Ref.
2016	Golden Globe Awards	Best Actor – Miniseries or Television Film	Oscar Isaac	Won	
2016	Writers Guild of America Awards	Long Form – Adapted	David Simon and William F. Zorzi	Nominated	
2016	Critics' Choice Television Awards	Best Movie or Miniseries		Nominated	
2016	Critics' Choice Television Awards	Best Actor – Movie or Miniseries	Oscar Isaac	Nominated	
2016	Critics' Choice Television Awards	Supporting Actress – Movie or Miniseries	Winona Ryder	Nominated	
2016	Directors Guild of America Awards	Outstanding Directing – Television Film	Paul Haggis	Nominated	
2016	Satellite Awards	Best Miniseries		Nominated	
2016	Satellite Awards	Best Actor – Miniseries or Television Film	Oscar Isaac	Nominated	
2016	Satellite Awards	Best Supporting Actress in a Series, Miniseries or TV Film	Catherine Keener	Nominated	
2016	USC Scripter Award	USC Scripter Award for Best Television Adapted Screenplay	David Simon, William F. Zorzi and Lisa Belkin	Won	
2016	Television Critics Association Award	Outstanding Achievement in Movies, Miniseries and Specials		Nominated	
