= Crime prevention through environmental design =

Urban planning paradigm

Crime prevention through environmental design (CPTED) is a system for developing the built environment to reduce the possibility of opportunistic crime and limit the perception of crime in a given neighborhood.

CPTED originated in the United States around 1960, when urban designers recognized that urban renewal strategies were risking the social framework needed for self-policing. Architect Oscar Newman created the concept of "defensible space", developing further the principles established by criminologist C. Ray Jeffery, who coined the term CPTED. The increased interest in environmental criminology led to a detailed study of specific topics such as natural surveillance, access control, and territoriality. The "broken window" principle, that neglected zones invite crime, reinforced the need for good property maintenance to assert visible ownership of space. Appropriate environmental design can also increase the perceived likelihood of detection and apprehension, the most significant crime deterrent. There has also been a new interest in the interior design of prisons as an environment that significantly affects offending decisions.

Wide-ranging recommendations to architects include planting trees and shrubs, eliminating escape routes, correcting the use of lighting, and encouraging pedestrian and bicycle traffic in streets. Tests show that the application of CPTED measures reduces criminal activity.

== History ==
CPTED was coined initially and formulated by criminologist C. Ray Jeffery. A more limited approach, termed defensible space, was developed concurrently by architect Oscar Newman. Both men built on the previous work of Elizabeth Wood, Jane Jacobs and Schlomo Angel. Jeffery's book, "Crime Prevention Through Environmental Design" came out in 1971, but his work was ignored throughout the 1970s. Newman's book, "Defensible Space: Crime Prevention through Urban Design" came out in 1972. His principles were widely adopted but with mixed success. The defensible space approach was subsequently revised with additional built environment approaches supported by CPTED. Newman represented this as CPTED and credited Jeffery as the originator of the CPTED term. Newman's CPTED-improved defensible space approach enjoyed broader success and resulted in a reexamination of Jeffery's work. Jeffery continued to expand the multi-disciplinary aspects of the approach, advances which he published, with the last one published in 1990. The Jeffery CPTED model is more comprehensive than the Newman CPTED model, which limits itself to the built environment. Later, CPTED models were developed based on the Newman Model, with criminologist Tim Crowe being the most popular.

As of 2004, CPTED is popularly understood to refer strictly to the Newman/Crowe type models, with the Jeffery model treated more as a multi-disciplinary approach to crime prevention that incorporates biology and psychology, a situation accepted even by Jeffery himself. (Robinson, 1996). A revision of CPTED, initiated in 1997 and termed 2nd Generation CPTED, adapts CPTED to offender individuality, further indicating that Jeffery's work is not popularly considered to be already a part of CPTED. In 2012, S Woodbridge introduced and developed CPTED in prison and showed how design flaws allowed criminals to keep offending.

=== 1960s ===
In the 1960s, Elizabeth Wood developed guidelines for addressing security issues while working with the Chicago Housing Authority, emphasizing design features that would support natural survivability. Her guidelines were never implemented, but they stimulated some of the original thinking that led to CPTED.

Jane Jacobs' book, The Death and Life of Great American Cities (1961), argued that urban diversity and vitality were being destroyed by urban planners and their urban renewal strategies. She was challenging the basic tenets of urban planning of the time: that neighborhoods should be isolated from each other, that an empty street is safer than a crowded one, and that the car represents progress over the pedestrian. An editor for Architectural Forum magazine (1952–1964), she had no formal training in urban planning, but her work emerged as a founding text for a new way of seeing cities. She felt that the way cities were being designed and built meant that the general public could not develop the social framework needed for effective self-policing. She pointed out that the new forms of urban design broke down many of the traditional controls on criminal behavior, for example, the ability of residents to watch the street and the presence of people using the street both night and day. She suggested that the lack of "natural guardianship" in the environment promoted crime. Jacobs developed the concept that crime flourishes when people do not meaningfully interact with their neighbors. In Death and Life, Jacobs listed the three attributes needed to make a city street safe: a clear distinction between private and public space; diversity of use; and a high level of pedestrian use of the sidewalks.

Schlomo Angel pioneered CPTED and studied under noted planner Christopher Alexander. Angel's Ph.D. thesis, Discouraging Crime Through City Planning, (1968), was a study of street crime in Oakland, CA. In it, he states: "The physical environment can exert a direct influence on crime settings by delineating territories, reducing or increasing accessibility by the creation or elimination of boundaries and circulation networks, and by facilitating surveillance by the citizenry and the police." He asserted that crime was inversely related to the level of activity on the street and that the commercial strip environment was particularly vulnerable to crime because it thinned out activity, making it easier for people to commit street crime. Angel developed and published CPTED concepts in 1970 in work supported and widely distributed by the United States Department of Justice (Luedtke, 1970).

=== 1970s ===
The phrase crime prevention through environmental design (CPTED) was first used by C. Ray Jeffery, a criminologist from Florida State University. The phrase began to gain acceptance after publishing his 1971 book of the same name.

Jeffery's work was based on the precepts of experimental psychology represented in modern learning theory. (Jeffery and Zahm, 1993:329) Jeffery's CPTED concept arose out of his experiences with a rehabilitative project in Washington, D.C., that attempted to control the school environment of juveniles in the area. Rooted deeply in the psychological learning theory of B.F. Skinner, Jeffery's CPTED approach emphasized the role of the physical environment in the development of pleasurable and painful experiences for the offender that would have the capacity to alter behavioral outcomes. His original CPTED model was a stimulus-response (S-R) model positing that the organism learned from environmental punishments and reinforcements. Jeffery "emphasized material rewards ... and the use of the physical environment to control behavior" (Jeffery and Zahm, 1993:330). The major idea here was that by removing the reinforcements for crime, it would not occur. (Robinson, 1996)

An often overlooked contribution of Jeffery in his 1971 book is outlining four critical factors in crime prevention that have stood the test of time. These are the degrees to which one can manipulate the opportunity for a crime to occur, the motivation for the crime to occur, the risk to the offender if the crime occurs, and the history of the offender who might consider committing the crime. The first three of these are within the control of the potential victim while the last is not.

Jeffery's work was ignored throughout the 1970s for reasons that have received little attention. Jeffery explains that when the world wanted prescriptive design solutions, his work presented a comprehensive theory and used it to identify a wide range of crime prevention functions that should drive design and management standards.

Concurrent with Jeffery's essentially theoretical work was Oscar Newman and George Rand's empirical study of the crime-environment connection conducted in the early 1970s. As an architect, Newman emphasized the specific design features, an emphasis missing in Jeffery's work. Newman's Defensible Space – Crime Prevention through Urban Design (1972) includes an extensive discussion of crime related to the physical form of housing based on crime data analysis from New York City public housing. Defensible Space changed the nature of the crime prevention and environmental design field. Within two years of its publication, substantial federal funding became available to demonstrate and study defensible space concepts.

As established by Newman, defensible space must contain two components. First, defensible space should allow people to see and be seen continuously. Ultimately, this diminishes residents' fear because they know that a potential offender can easily be observed, identified, and apprehended. Second, people must be willing to intervene or report crime when it occurs. Increasing the sense of security in settings where people live, and work encourages people to take control of the areas and assume a role of ownership. When people feel safe in their neighborhoods, they are more likely to interact with one another and intervene when crime occurs. These remain central to most implementations of CPTED as of 2004.

In 1977, Jeffery's second edition of Crime Prevention Through Environmental Design expanded his theoretical approach to embrace a more complex model of behavior in which variable physical environments, offender behavior as individuals, and behavior of individual members of the general public have reciprocal influences on one another. This laid the foundation for Jeffery to develop a behavioral model to predict the effects of modifying both the external and internal environments of individual offenders.

=== 1980s ===
By the 1980s, the defensible space prescriptions of the 1970s were determined to have mixed effectiveness. They worked best in residential settings, especially where residents were relatively free to respond to cues to increase social interaction. Defensible space design tools were observed to be marginally effective in institutional and commercial settings. As a result, Newman and others moved to improve defensible space, adding CPTED-based features. They also deemphasized less effective aspects of defensible space. Contributions to the advance of CPTED in the 1980s included:

- The "broken windows" theory, put forth by James Q. Wilson and George L. Kelling in 1982, explored the impact that visible deterioration and neglect in neighborhoods have on behavior. Property maintenance was added as a CPTED strategy on par with surveillance, access control, and territoriality. The Broken Windows theory may go hand in hand with CPTED. Crime is attracted to the areas that are not taken care of or that have been abandoned. CPTED adds a feeling of pride and ownership to the community. With no more "broken windows" in specific neighborhoods, crime will continue to decline and eventually fall out entirely.
- Canadian academicians Patricia and Paul Brantingham published Environmental Criminology in 1981. According to the authors, a crime occurs when all essential elements are present. These elements include a law, an offender, a target, and a place. They characterize these as "the four dimensions of crime," with environmental criminology studying the last of the four dimensions.
- British criminologists Ronald V. Clarke and Patricia Mayhew developed their "situational crime prevention" approach: reducing the opportunity to offend by improving the design and management of the environment.
- Criminologist Timothy Crowe developed his CPTED training programs.

=== 1990s ===
Criminology: An Interdisciplinary Approach (1990) was Jeffery's final contribution to CPTED. The Jeffery CPTED model evolved to one which assumes that

The environment never influences behavior directly, but only through the brain. Any model of crime prevention must include both the brain and the physical environment. ... Because the approach contained in Jeffery's CPTED model is today based on many fields, including scientific knowledge of modern brain sciences, a focus on only external environmental crime prevention is inadequate as it ignores another entire dimension of CPTED – i.e., the internal environment. (Robinson, 1996)

Crime Prevention Through Environmental Design (1991) by criminologist Tim Crowe provided a solid foundation for CPTED's progress throughout the 1990s.

From 1994 through 2002, Sparta Consulting Corporation, led by Severin Sorensen, CPP, managed the US Government's largest CPTED technical assistance and training program titled Crime Prevention Through Environmental Design (CPTED) in Public Housing Technical Assistance and Training Program, funded by the United States Department of Housing and Urban Development(HUD). During this period, Sorensen worked with Ronald V. Clarke and the Sparta team to develop a new CPTED Curriculum that used Situational Crime Prevention as an underlying theoretical basis for CPTED measures. A curriculum was developed and trained for public and assisted housing stakeholders, and follow-up CPTED assessments were conducted at various sites. The Sparta-led CPTED projects showed statistical reductions in self-reported FBI UCR Part I crimes between 17% and 76% depending on the basket of CPTED measures employed in specific high-crime, low-income settings in the United States.

In 1996, Oscar Newman published an update to his earlier CPTED works, titled Creating Defensible Space, through the Office of Policy Development and Research (PDR) at HUD.

In 1997, Greg Saville and Gerry Cleveland, 2nd Generation CPTED, wrote an article exhorting CPTED practitioners to consider the original social ecology origins of CPTED, including social and psychological issues beyond the built environment.

=== 2000s ===
By 2004, elements of the CPTED approach had gained wide international acceptance due to law enforcement efforts to embrace it. The CPTED term "environment" is commonly used to refer to the external environment of the place. Jeffery's intention that CPTED also embrace the internal environment of the offender seems to have been lost, even on those promoting the expansion of CPTED to include social ecology and psychology under the banner of 2nd Generation CPTED.

In 2012, S Woodbridge introduced and developed the concept of CPTED within a prison environment, a place where crime continues after conviction. Jeffery's understanding of the criminal mind from his study in rehabilitative facilities over forty years ago was now being used to reduce crime in those same types of facilities. Woodbridge showed how prison design allowed offending to continue and introduced changes to reduce crime.

CPTED techniques are increasingly benefiting from integration with design technologies. For instance, models of proposed buildings developed in Building Information Modeling may be imported into video game engines to assess their resilience to different forms of crime.

== Strategies for the built environment ==
CPTED strategies rely on influencing offender decisions that precede criminal acts. Research into criminal behavior shows that the decision to offend or not to offend is more influenced by cues to the perceived risk of being caught than by cues to reward or ease of entry. The certainty of being caught is the central deterrence for criminals, not the severity of the punishment. By emphasizing a certainty of capture, criminal actions can be decreased. Consistent with this research, CPTED-based strategies enhance the perceived risk of detection and apprehension.

Consistent with the widespread implementation of defensible space guidelines in the 1970s, most implementations of CPTED by 2004 were based solely upon the theory that the proper design and effective use of the built environment can reduce crime, reduce the fear of crime, and improve the quality of life. Built environment implementations of CPTED seek to dissuade offenders from committing crimes by manipulating the built environment in which those crimes occur. The six main concepts, according to Moffat, are territoriality, surveillance, access control, image/maintenance, activity support, and target hardening. Applying these strategies is crucial when trying to prevent crime in any neighborhood, whether crime-ridden or not.

Natural surveillance and access control strategies limit the opportunity for crime. Territorial reinforcement promotes social control through a variety of measures. Image/maintenance and activity support provide the community with reassurance and the ability to inhibit crime through citizen activities. Target hardening strategies work within CPTED, delaying entry sufficiently to ensure a certainty of capture in the criminal mind.

=== Natural surveillance ===
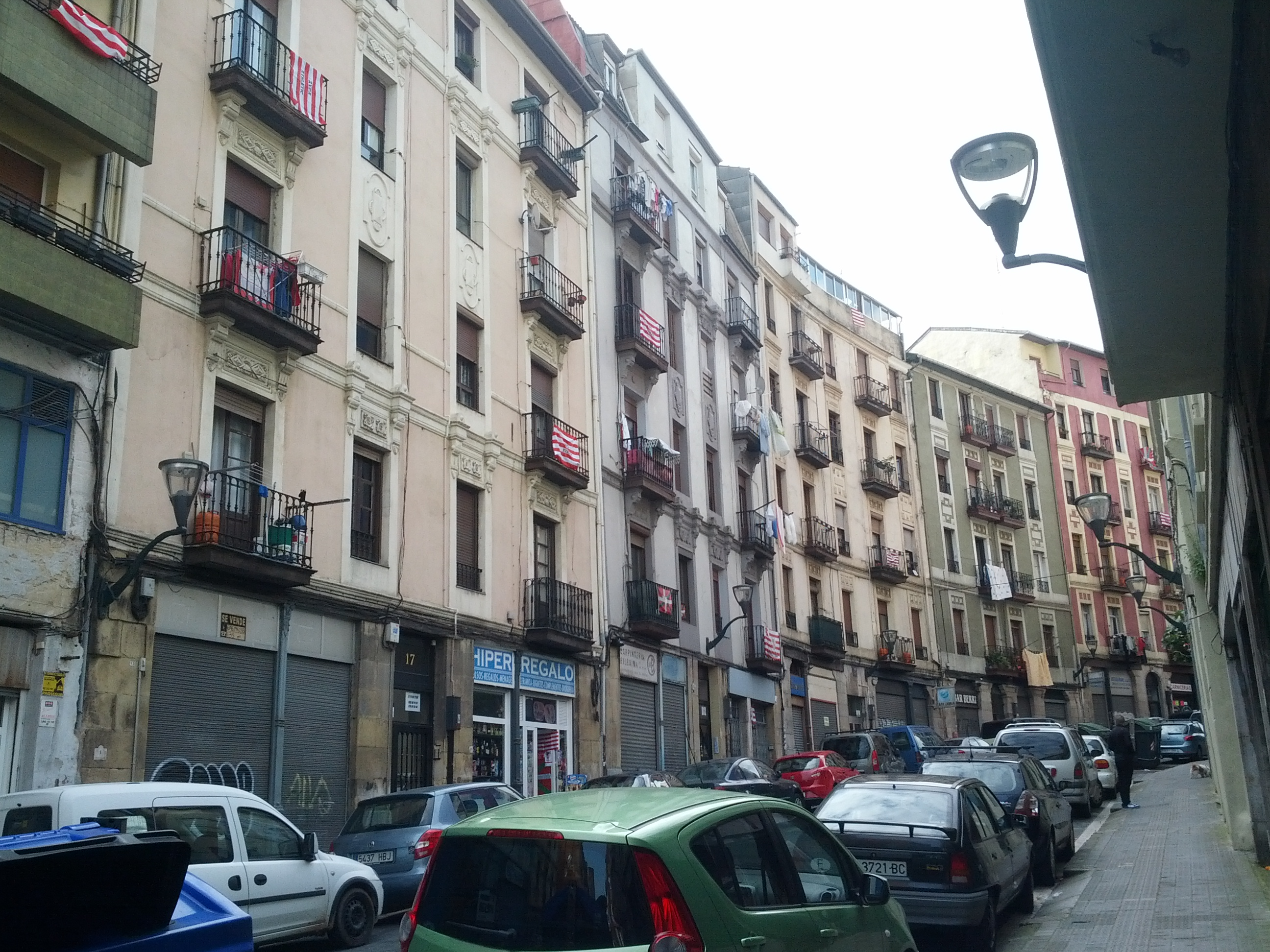
This curved street with balconies allows for additional opportunities for residents to spot suspicious activity while also making it difficult for criminals to plan escape routes.

Natural surveillance increases the perceived risk of attempting deviant actions by improving the visibility of potential offenders to the general public. Natural surveillance occurs by designing the placement of physical features, activities, and people in such a way as to maximize the visibility of the space and its users, fostering positive social interaction among legitimate users of private and public space. Potential offenders feel increased scrutiny and thus inherently perceive an increase in risk. This perceived increase in risk extends to the perceived lack of viable and covert escape routes.

- Design streets to increase pedestrian and bicycle traffic
- Place windows overlooking sidewalks and parking lots.
- Leave window shades open.
- Use passing vehicular traffic as a surveillance asset.
- Create landscape designs that provide surveillance, especially near designated and opportunistic entry points.
- Use the shortest, least sight-limiting fence appropriate for the situation.
- Use transparent weather vestibules at building entrances.
- When creating lighting design, avoid poorly placed lights that create blind spots for potential observers and miss critical areas. Ensure potential problem areas are well lit: pathways, stairs, entrances/exits, parking areas, ATMs, phone kiosks, mailboxes, bus stops, children's play areas, recreation areas, pools, laundry rooms, storage areas, dumpster and recycling areas, etc.
- Avoid too-bright security lighting that creates blinding glare and deep shadows, hindering potential observers' views. Eyes adapt to night lighting and have trouble adjusting to severe lighting disparities. Using lower-intensity lights often requires more fixtures.
- Use shielded or cut-off luminaires to control glare.
- Place lighting along pathways and other pedestrian-use areas at proper heights for lighting the faces of the people in the space (and to identify the faces of potential attackers).
- Use curved streets with multiple viewpoints to multiple houses' entrances, making the escape route difficult to follow.

Mechanical and organizational measures can complement natural surveillance measures. For example, closed-circuit television (CCTV) cameras can be added in areas where window surveillance is unavailable.

=== Natural access control ===
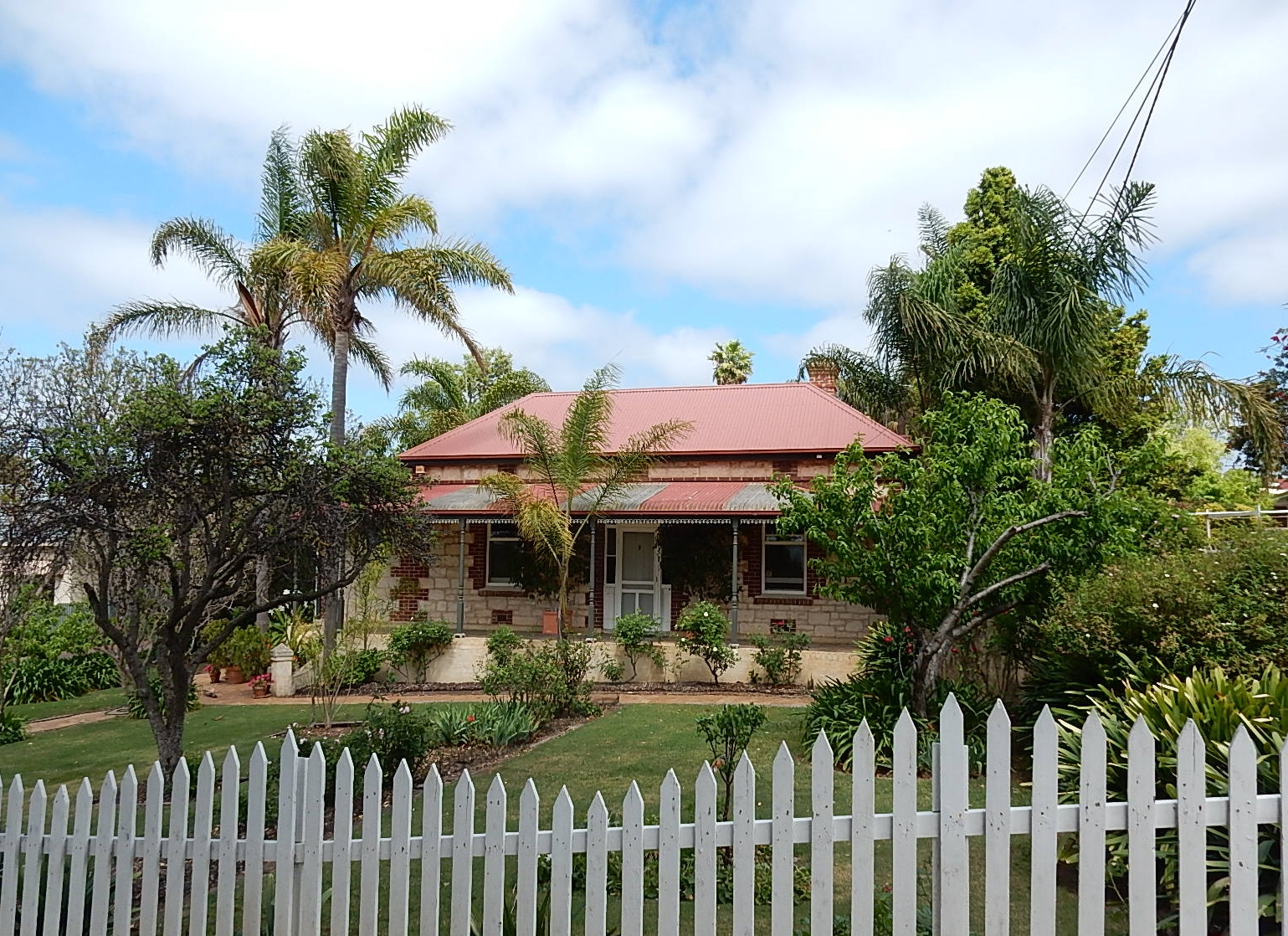
A picket fence reduces access while allowing bystanders to see suspicious activity.

Natural access control limits the opportunity for crime by taking steps to differentiate between public space and private space. Natural access control occurs by selectively placing entrances and exits, fencing, lighting, and landscape to limit access or control flow.

- Use a single, clearly identifiable point of entry
- Use structures to divert persons to reception areas
- Incorporate maze entrances in public restrooms. This avoids the isolation that is produced by an anteroom or double-door entry system
- Use low, thorny bushes beneath ground-level windows. Use rambling or climbing thorny plants next to fences to discourage intrusion.
- Eliminate design features that provide access to roofs or upper levels
- In the front yard, use waist-level, picket-type fencing along residential property lines to control access and encourage surveillance.
- Use a locking gate between the front and backyards.
- Use shoulder-level, open-type fencing along lateral residential property lines between side yards and extending to between backyards. They should be sufficiently unencumbered with landscaping to promote social interaction between neighbors.
- Use substantial, high, closed fencing (for example, masonry) between a backyard and a public alley instead of a wall that blocks the view from all angles.

Natural access control complements mechanical and operational access control measures, such as target hardening.

=== Natural territorial reinforcement ===
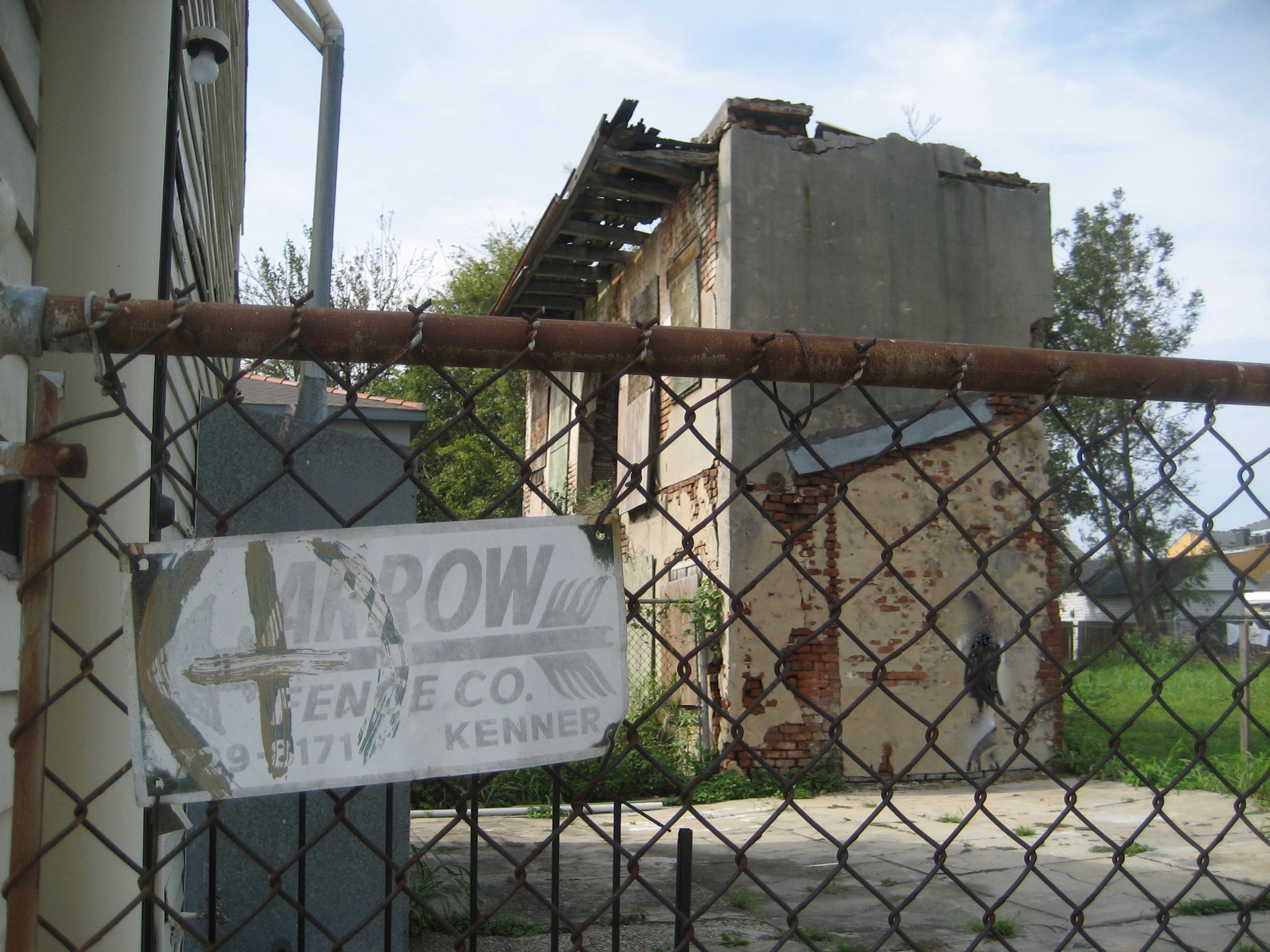
A dilapidated chain link fence signals that the building it is protecting is not very secured, while a well maintained bush indicates risk due to evidence of recent activity.

Territorial reinforcement promotes social control through an increased space definition and improved proprietary concern. An environment designed to delineate private space does two things. First, it creates a sense of ownership. Owners have a vested interest and are more likely to challenge intruders or report them to the police. Second, the sense of owned space creates an environment where "strangers" or "intruders" stand out and are more easily identified. Natural territorial reinforcement uses buildings, fences, pavement, signs, lighting, and landscape to express ownership and define public, semi-public, and private spaces. Additionally, these objectives can be achieved by assignment of space to designated users in previously unassigned locations.

- Maintained premises and landscaping to communicate an alert and active presence occupying the space.
- Provide trees in residential areas. Research results indicate that contrary to traditional views within the law enforcement community, outdoor residential spaces with more trees are seen as significantly more attractive, safer, and more likely to be used than similar spaces without trees.
- Restrict private activities to defined private areas.
- Display security system signage at access points.
- Avoid chain link fencing and razor-wire fence topping, as they communicate the absence of a physical presence and reduce the risk of being detected.
- Placing amenities such as seating or refreshments in common areas in a commercial or institutional setting helps to attract larger numbers of desired users.
- Scheduling activities in common areas increases proper use, attracts more people, and increases the perception that these areas are controlled.
- Motion sensor lights at all entry points into the residence.

Territorial reinforcement measures make the intended user feel safe and make the potential offender aware of a substantial risk of apprehension or scrutiny. When people take pride in what they own and take the proper measures to protect their belongings, crime is deterred from those areas because it makes it more of a challenge.

=== Other CPTED elements ===
Support and maintenance activities complement physical design elements.

==== Maintenance ====
Maintenance is an expression of ownership of property. Deterioration indicates less control by a site's intended users and a greater tolerance of disorder. The Broken Windows Theory is a valuable tool in understanding the importance of maintenance in deterring crime. Broken Windows theory proponents support a zero tolerance approach to property maintenance, observing that a broken window will entice vandals to break more nearby windows. The sooner broken windows are fixed, the less likely such vandalism will occur. Vandalism falls into the broken windows category as well. The faster the graffiti is painted over, the less likely one is to repeat it because no one saw what has been done. A positive image in the community shows a sense of pride and self-worth that no one can take away from the property owner.

==== Activity support ====
Activity support increases the use of a built environment for safe activities to increase the risk of detecting criminal and undesirable activities. Natural surveillance by the intended users is casual, and there is no specific plan for people to watch out for criminal activity. By placing signs cautioning children to play and signs for certain activities in the area, the citizens of that area will be more involved in what is happening around them. They will be more tuned in to who is and is not supposed to be there and what looks suspicious.

== Effectiveness and criticism ==
CPTED strategies are most successful when they inconvenience the end user the least and when the CPTED design process relies upon the combined efforts of environmental designers, land managers, community activists, and law enforcement professionals. These strategies cannot be fulfilled without the community's help, and they require the whole community in the location to make the environment safer. A meta-analysis of multiple-component CPTED initiatives in the United States has found that they have decreased robberies between 30% and 84%.

In terms of effectiveness, a more accurate title for the strategy would be crime deterrence through environmental design. Research demonstrates that offenders might not always be prevented from committing some crimes by using CPTED. CPTED relies upon changes to the physical environment that will cause an offender to make certain behavioral decisions, and some of those decisions will include desisting from crime. Those changes deter rather than conclusively "prevent" behavior.

== See also ==
- Crime-Free Multi-Housing
- Environmental psychology
- Hostile architecture
- Social architecture
- Urban vitality
