= Defensible space theory =

Urban planning theory

The defensible space theory of architect and city planner Oscar Newman encompasses ideas about crime prevention and neighborhood safety. Newman argues that architectural and environmental design play a crucial part in increasing or reducing criminality. The theory was developed in the early 1970s, and he wrote his first book on the topic, Defensible Space, in 1972. The book contains a study from New York that pointed out that higher crime rates existed in high-rise housing projects than in low-rise complexes. This, he concluded, was because residents felt no control or personal responsibility for an area occupied by so many people. Throughout his study, Newman focused on explaining his ideas on social control, crime prevention, and public health in relation to community design.

== Theory ==
As defined in Newman's book Design Guidelines for Creating Defensible Space, defensible space is "a residential environment whose physical characteristics—building layout and site plan—function to allow inhabitants themselves to become key agents in ensuring their security." He goes on to explain that a housing development is only defensible if residents intend to adopt this role, which is defined by good design: "Defensible space therefore is a sociophysical phenomenon," says Newman. Both society and physical elements are parts of a successful defensible space.

The theory argues that an area is safer when people feel a sense of ownership and responsibility for that piece of a community. Newman asserts that "the criminal is isolated because his turf is removed" when each space in an area is owned and cared for by a responsible party. If an intruder can sense a watchful community, he feels less secure committing his crime. The idea is that crime and delinquency can be controlled and mitigated through environmental design.

There are five factors that make a defensible space:

1. Territoriality – the idea that one's home is sacred
2. Natural surveillance – the link between an area's physical characteristics and the residents' ability to see what is happening
3. Image – the capacity of the physical design to impart a sense of security
4. Milieu – other features that may affect security, such as proximity to a police substation or busy commercial area
5. Safe Adjoining Areas - for better security, residents obtain higher ability of surveillance of adjoining area through designing the adjoining area

The concept of defensible space is controversial. A United States Department of Justice experiment in Hartford, Connecticut, closed streets and assigned police teams to certain neighborhoods. New public housing projects were designed around ideas of limited access to the city, but Hartford did not show any dramatic drop in crime.

== Intention ==
The intention of physical features is to create a sense of territorialism in community members which will ensure a safe living environment for those that care for it. Defensible space works with a hierarchy of living and community spaces. According to the theory, housing developments that evoke territorialism are "the strongest deterrents to criminal and vandal activity." Housing should be grouped in such a way that members feel a mutual benefit. Also to deter crime, areas should be defined for function, paths should be defined for movement, outdoor areas should be juxtaposed with homes, and indoor spaces should visually provide for close watch of outside areas.

Newman holds that through good design, people should not only feel comfortable questioning what is happening in their surroundings, but they should feel obligated to do so. Any intruder should be able to sense the existence of a watchful community and avoid the situation altogether. Criminals fear the likelihood that a resident, upon viewing the intrusion, would then question their actions. This is highly effective in neighborhoods that cannot afford professional crime watch.

The defensible space theory is applicable to any type of planned space. From low density housing to high rises, the key is the development of a communal area in which residents can "extend the realm of their homes and the zone of felt responsibility." Circulation paths and common entry are important aspects of defensible design as well. Residents must also feel a need to extend their protective attitudes to locations where property and urban streets and surroundings connect. The interfacing between private property and community space should be protected similarly.

Newman's intent in creating the principles of defensible space is to give the residents of a community control of public spaces that they formerly felt were out of reach. In effect, residents care enough for their area to protect it from crime as they would protect their own private property.

=== Principles ===
Oscar Newman's basic five principles of designing defensible space as quoted in Design Guidelines for Creating Defensible Space are as follows:

1. The assignment to different resident groups the specific environments they are best able to utilize and control, as determined by their ages, life-styles, socializing proclivities, backgrounds, incomes, and family structures.
2. The territorial definition of space in residential developments to reflect the zone of influence of specific inhabitants. Residential environments should be subdivided into zones toward which adjacent residents can easily adopt proprietary attitudes.
3. The juxtaposition of dwelling interiors with exterior spaces and the placement of windows to allow residents to naturally survey the exterior and interior public areas of their living environments and the areas assigned for their use.
4. The juxtaposition of dwellings—their entries and amenities—with city streets so as to incorporate the streets within the sphere of influence of the residential environment.
5. The adoption of building forms and idioms that avoids the stigma of peculiarity that allows others to perceive the vulnerability and isolation of a particular group of inhabitants.

To create a defensible space community, residential areas should be subdivided into smaller entities of similar families because control is enhanced. Responsibility for the area is more easily assumed in a smaller group of families as opposed to a larger community. Smaller groups more frequently use an area geared toward them. The number of activities in the space is increased; thus, a feeling of ownership and a need to protect the property follows. On the other hand, when larger groups use a community space, no one has control over the area, and an agreement over its acceptable uses is often in dispute.

=== Housing types ===
In Newman's 1980 book, Community of Interest, he provided recommended housing types for different family types. He recommended families with children to live in single-family homes and walk-up apartments. However, mid-rise buildings with a doorman is okay if it is a smaller family. He recommended the elderly live in mid-rise and high-rise buildings with a doorman and sometimes these buildings without a doorman would suffice. Lastly, since working adults often treat housing as a hotel guest, mid-rise and high-rise buildings with a doorman is highly recommended.

== Today ==
The defensible space theory was largely popular in city design from its emergence until the 1980s. Some of his basic ideas are still taken into consideration at present, and all contemporary approaches and discussions of the relationship between crime and house design use Newman's theory as a critical point of reference. Although modifications were made to the original theory in the 1980s, Newman's basic principles still exist in design, and have been used by the United States Department of Housing and Urban Development as "both a criminological concept and a proven strategy for enhancing our Nation's quality of life".

In the UK, defensible space remains the basis of Secured By Design, a police initiative that modifies plans for public spaces in ways that they believe will deter crime by limiting routes through neighbourhoods, maximising surveillance, and removing amenities that draw non-residents.

== In popular culture ==
In the HBO miniseries Show Me a Hero, Newman, a recurring character, articulates his theory of defensible space to Judge Sand as they try to plan where to place two hundred new units of desegregated public housing in the city of Yonkers, New York.

== See also ==
- City Beautiful movement
- The Death and Life of Great American Cities
- Crime prevention through environmental design (CPTED)
- Broken windows theory
- Victimology
