= Oscar Newman (architect) =

Canadian-born American architect and researcher (1935 – 2004)

- Born: September 30, 1935
- Died: April 14, 2004 (aged 68)
- Occupation: Architect
- Practice: Oscar Newman and Associates

Oscar Newman (30 September 1935 – 14 April 2004) was a Canadian-born American architect and researcher most known for his defensible space theory, a precursor to crime prevention through environmental design.

== Theory ==
As defined in Newman's book Design Guidelines for Creating Defensible Space (1972), defensible space is "a residential environment whose physical characteristics—building layout and site plan—function to allow inhabitants themselves to become key agents in ensuring their security." The theory argues that an area is safer when people feel a sense of ownership and responsibility for that piece of a community. Newman asserts that "the criminal is isolated because his turf is removed" when each space in an area is owned and cared for by a responsible party. For example, for the projects "high rise = high crime", overall crime rate of high-rise neighborhoods in 1970s was double that of the low-rises with similar demographics, while crime within the inside public places (like corridors) seven times higher. According to the study, "In a high‐rise, doubleloaded corridor apartment tower, the only defensible space is the interior of the apartment itself; everything else is a no man's land, neither public nor private ... Unlike the well‐peopled and continually surveyed public streets, these interior areas are sparsely used and impossible to survey; they become a nether world of fear and crime."

== Biography ==
Newman started his academic career as the assistant professor at the Nova Scotia Technical College in Halifax (1961–1963), followed by a brief period at the University of Montreal (1963–1964) and moved on to the Washington University in St. Louis, where he started his work on defensible space principles of architecture as an associate professor of architecture, leaving university for New York in 1968, four years prior to publication of his main work, "Design Guidelines for Creating Defensible Space". He was then an associate professor of architecture at the Columbia University in 1968-1970 and associate professor of city planning at the New York University (1970–73).

Newman had founded his own New York City-based company, Oscar Newman and Associates, for architecture and city planning, in 1968, and was a president of the Institute for Community Design Analysis since 1972.

== In Media ==
Newman was portrayed by Peter Riegert in the 2015 miniseries Show Me a Hero.

== Bibliography ==
Per the Writer's Directory 2008 (excluding fiction):

- Defensible Space, 1972
- Architectural Design for Crime Prevention, 1973
- Design Guidelines for Achieving Defensible Space, 1976
- Community of Interest, 1980
- Review and Analysis of the Chicago Housing Authority, 1982
- Long Term Housing Plan for the City of Yonkers, 1987
- Plan for District 7 of the City of Plantation, 1989
- Improving the Viability of Two Dayton Communities, 1992
- Analysis of Sites in Nine CCP Cities, 1994
- Creating Defensible Space, 1996

== Awards ==
- Man of Year, Law Enforcement News, 1995
- Achievement award, Environmental Design Research Conference, 1997
- Annual Award of Achievement, Environmental Design Research Association, 1998

== Sources ==
- Newman, Oscar (2017-02-20). "Defensible Space as a Crime Preventive Measure". The City Between Freedom and Security. De Gruyter. pp. 65–77. doi:10.1515/9783035607611-008. ISBN 978-3-0356-0761-1.
- Smyth, Aidan (2021). "The architecture of fear". Washington University Political Review.
- Kazensky, M. (2007). The Writers Directory 2008. Gale virtual reference library. Thomson Gale. ISBN 978-1-55862-600-3.
