= Social framework analysis =

Sociological methodology

Social framework analysis is a sociological methodology that was a key component of a 2011 United States Supreme Court case regarding employment discrimination at Wal-Mart. Professor William T. Bielby has used the social framework analysis methodology to conclude that two aspects of Wal-Mart's culture, centralized personnel policy and managerial subjective decision making in the field, led to “decisions about compensation and promotion" to be vulnerable to gender bias. Bielby's contribution to this matter has been controversial. The American Sociological Association has commented that his work “is well within our discipline’s accepted methods;” however, Laurens Walker, one of the two professors who coined the term, has contested the validity of Bielby's work.

Experts in many disciplines, for example, would contest statements like that made by Professor Bielby when he told the trial court that he had collected general “scientific evidence about gender bias, stereotypes and the structure and dynamics of gender inequality in organizations.” As pure social facts (or socially constructed categories), ideas like gender bias, stereotypes, and gender inequality cannot have "scientific" evidence collected about them, because what needs to be a fact to make knowledge "scientific" is contingent on the participant's view of the situation. In addition to the law, misunderstandings about the nature of social versus natural facts also have had a deep impact on disciplines like intelligence analysis, where similarly contested social categories are treated as natural facts independent of the observer. At least one scholar has linked this misapprehension to the problem to strategic surprise, and the June 20th, 2011 Supreme Court decision is likely to have such an impact on this theory's application the Law more generally.
