= Detective =

Investigator in law enforcement

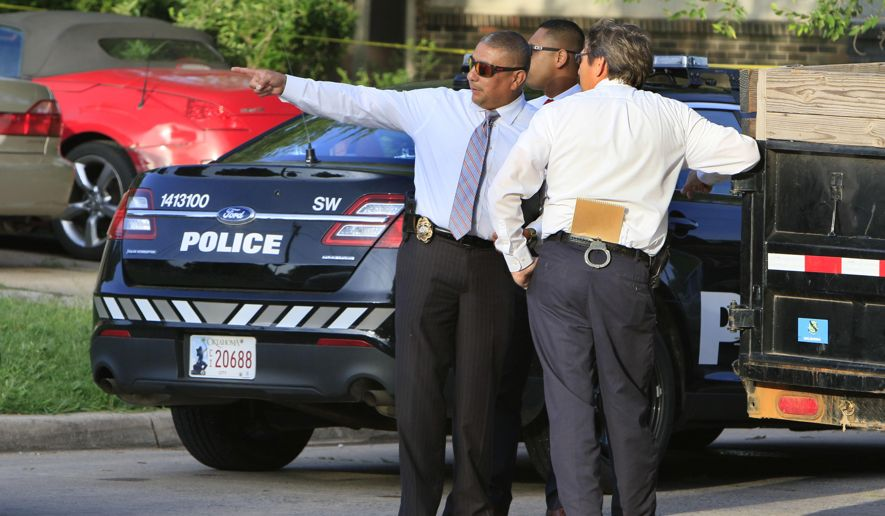
- Police detectives investigating a homicide in Oklahoma City, Oklahoma, United States

Occupation
- Activity sectors: Criminal investigation

Description
- Competencies: Criminological knowledge, knowledge of the law, literacy and numeracy, reasoning skills and social skills
- Education required: Secondary or tertiary education
- Fields of employment: Law enforcement or private investigation
- Related jobs: Police officer, private investigator, bounty hunter

A detective is an investigator, usually a member of a law enforcement agency. They often collect information to solve crimes by talking to witnesses and informants, collecting physical evidence, or searching records in databases. This leads them to arrest criminals and enable them to be convicted in court. A detective may work for the police or privately.

== Overview ==
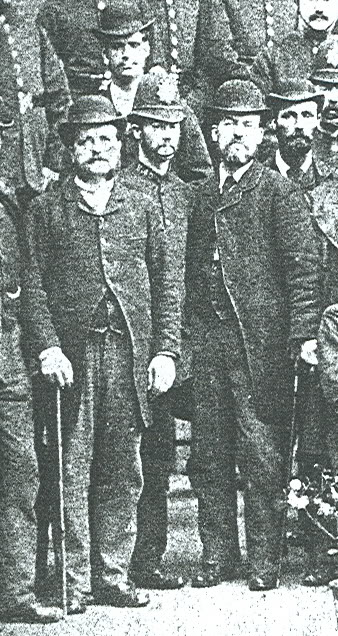
H Division, of police detectives, including Frederick Abberline (left, with cane), at Leman Street police station, of the London Metropolitan Police, two years before the Jack the Ripper serial killer murders of 1888. Photograph circa 1886

Informally, and primarily in fiction, a detective is a licensed or unlicensed person who solves crimes, including historical crimes, by examining and evaluating clues and personal records in order to uncover the identity and/or whereabouts of criminals.

In some police departments, a detective position is obtained by passing a written test after a person completes the requirements for being a police officer. In many other police systems, detectives are college graduates who join directly from civilian life without first serving as uniformed officers. Some argue that detectives do a completely different job and therefore require completely different training, qualifications, qualities, and abilities than uniformed officers. The other side says that a detective who has worked as a uniformed officer will excel as a private detective due to their knowledge about standard police procedures, their contact network and their own experience with typical problems.

Some are not public officials, and may be known as a private investigator, colloquially referred to, especially in fiction, as a "PI" or "private eye", or "shamus".

=== Organization ===
The detective branch in most large police agencies is organized into several squads and departments, each of which specializes in investigation into a particular type of crime or a particular type of undercover operation, which may include: homicide, robbery, burglary, auto theft, organized crimes, missing persons, juvenile crime, fraud, narcotics, vice, criminal intelligence, aggravated assault/battery, sexual assault, computer crime, domestic violence, surveillance, and arson, among others.

In police departments of the United States, a regular detective typically holds the rank of "Detective". The rank structure of the officers who supervise them (who may or may not be detectives themselves) varies considerably by department. In some Commonwealth police forces, detectives have equivalent ranks to uniformed officers but with the word "Detective" prepended to it; e.g. "Detective Constable" (DC) or "Detective Sergeant" (DS).

=== Private detectives ===
In some countries, courts and judicial processes have yet to recognize the practice of private detectives. In Portugal, presented proof loses significance when private detectives collect it. Even under these circumstances, the practice is in demand and governed by a code of conduct.

=== Citizen detectives ===
A citizen detective, also known as an amateur detective, is an individual who devotes their time and expertise to aid in the solving of crime, without compensation or expectation of reward. Citizen detectives are private citizens that have no real professional relationship with law enforcement and lack any rational-legal authority whatsoever. The reasons why a private citizen might try to solve a crime vary from trying to ensure justice for a friend or relative, a strong dislike for crime and support for law and order, or just recreational enjoyment.

As with other kinds of detectives, citizen detectives try to solve crimes in multiple ways such as searching a crime scene, interviewing and/or interrogating suspects and witnesses, doing surveillance on persons of interest, collecting evidence, acting as sources for local news, giving anonymous tips to the police and at times even making citizen's arrests while a crime is being committed. Citizen detectives can also help law enforcement by becoming witnesses for prosecutors, participating in local neighborhood watch groups, acting as citizen observers for law enforcement, or even aiding the police in searching for and arresting suspects as a posse. However, there have been cases of citizen detectives unintentionally compromising investigations if they lack real crime solving skills or even committing acts against suspected criminals that could be deemed vigilantism in nature.

== History ==
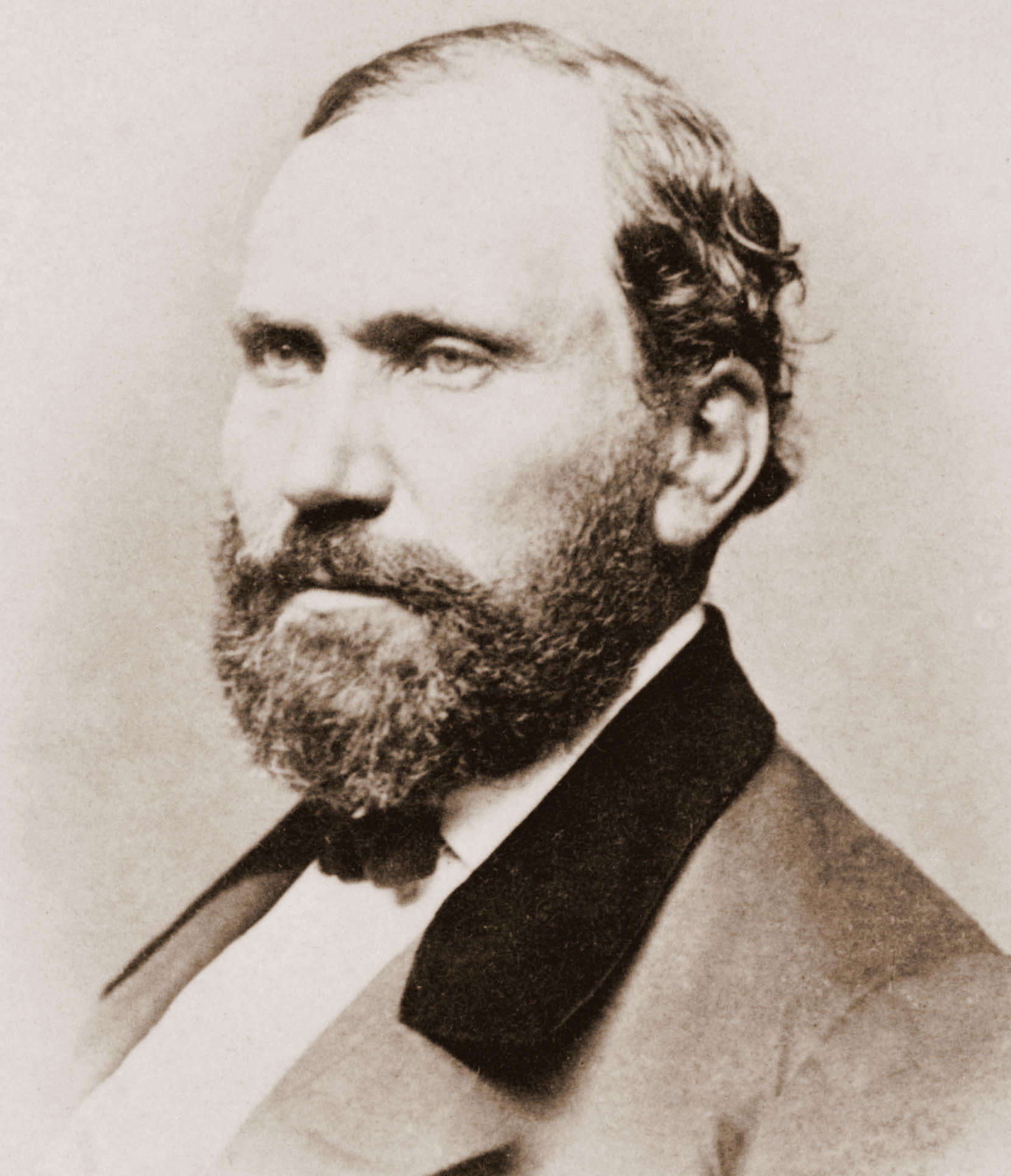
Allan Pinkerton (pictured here circa 1861) was, in 1850, a detective of the Chicago Police Department and, in 1851, the founder of the Pinkerton Detective Agency.

Before the 19th century, there were few municipal police departments, though the first had been created in Paris as early as 1667. As police work went from being done by appointed people with help from volunteers to being done by professionals, the idea of dedicated detectives did not come up right away. The first private detective agency was founded in Paris in 1833 by Eugène François Vidocq, who had headed a police agency in addition to being a criminal himself. Police detective activities were pioneered in England by the Bow Street Runners and later by the Metropolitan Police Service in Greater London. The first police detective unit in the United States was formed in 1846 in Boston.

== Techniques ==
=== Street work ===
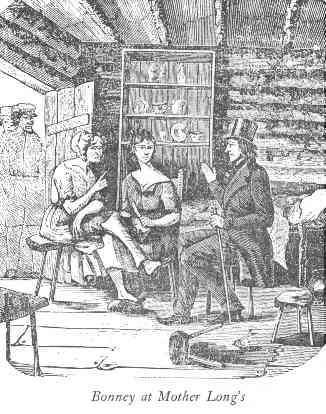
Edward Bonney, an American bounty hunter and amateur detective from Iowa who in 1845 infiltrated the "Banditti of the Prairie", wrote the 1850 book The Banditti of the Prairies: or, The murderer's doom, a tale of Mississippi Valley and the Far West; woodcut from 1850.

Detectives have a wide variety of techniques available in conducting investigations. However, the majority of cases are solved by the interrogation of suspects and the interviewing of witnesses, which takes time. Detectives may also use their network of informants, which they have built up over the years. Informants often have connections with people a detective would not be able to approach formally. Evidence collection and preservation can also help in identifying a potential suspect(s).

=== Criminal investigation ===
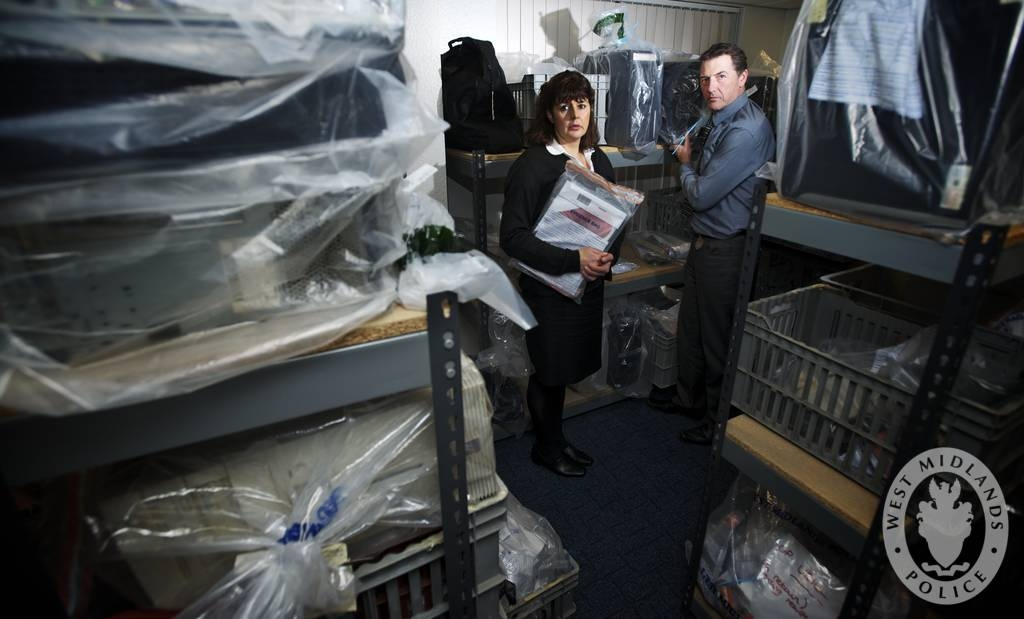
Detectives of the West Midlands Police in the United Kingdom surrounded by electronic devices seized as evidence

Investigation of criminal activity is conducted by the police. Criminal activity can relate to road use such as speeding, drunk driving, or to matters such as theft, drug distribution, assault, fraud, etc. When the police have concluded their investigation, a decision on whether to charge somebody with a criminal offence will (depending on legal jurisdiction) often be made by prosecuting counsel having considered the evidence produced by the police.

In criminal investigations, once a detective has suspects in mind, the next step is to produce evidence that will stand up in a court of law. One way is to obtain a confession from the suspect; usually, this is done by developing rapport and, at times, by seeking information in exchange for potential perks available through the attorney's office, such as entering for a lesser sentence in exchange for usable information. In some countries, detectives may lie, mislead and psychologically pressure a suspect into an admission or confession as long as they do this within procedural boundaries and without the threat of violence or promises outside their control. This is not permitted in England and Wales, where interview of suspects and witnesses is governed by the Police and Criminal Evidence Act 1984 and its extensive Codes of Practice.

=== Forensic evidence ===
Physical forensic evidence in an investigation may provide leads to closing a case. Forensic science (often shortened to forensics) is the application of a broad spectrum of sciences to answer questions of interest to the legal system. This may be in relation to a crime or to a civil action. Many major police stations in a city, county, or state, maintain their own forensic laboratories while others contract out the services.

=== Records investigation ===
Detectives may use public and private records to provide background information on a subject. Police detectives can search through files of fingerprint records. Police maintain records of people who have committed felonies and some misdemeanors. Detectives may search through records of criminal arrests and convictions, photographs or "mug shots" of persons arrested, hotel registration information, credit reports, answering machine messages, phone conversations, surveillance camera footage, and technology used for communication.

== Worldwide ==
=== United Kingdom ===
Before 2017, prospective British police detectives must have completed at least two years as a uniformed officer before applying to join the Criminal Investigation Department. Since 2017, applicants from outside the police force have been able to apply directly for positions as trainee detectives. UK Police must also pass the National Investigators' Examination in order to progress to subsequent stages of the Initial Crime Investigators Development Program in order to qualify as a detective.

=== United States ===
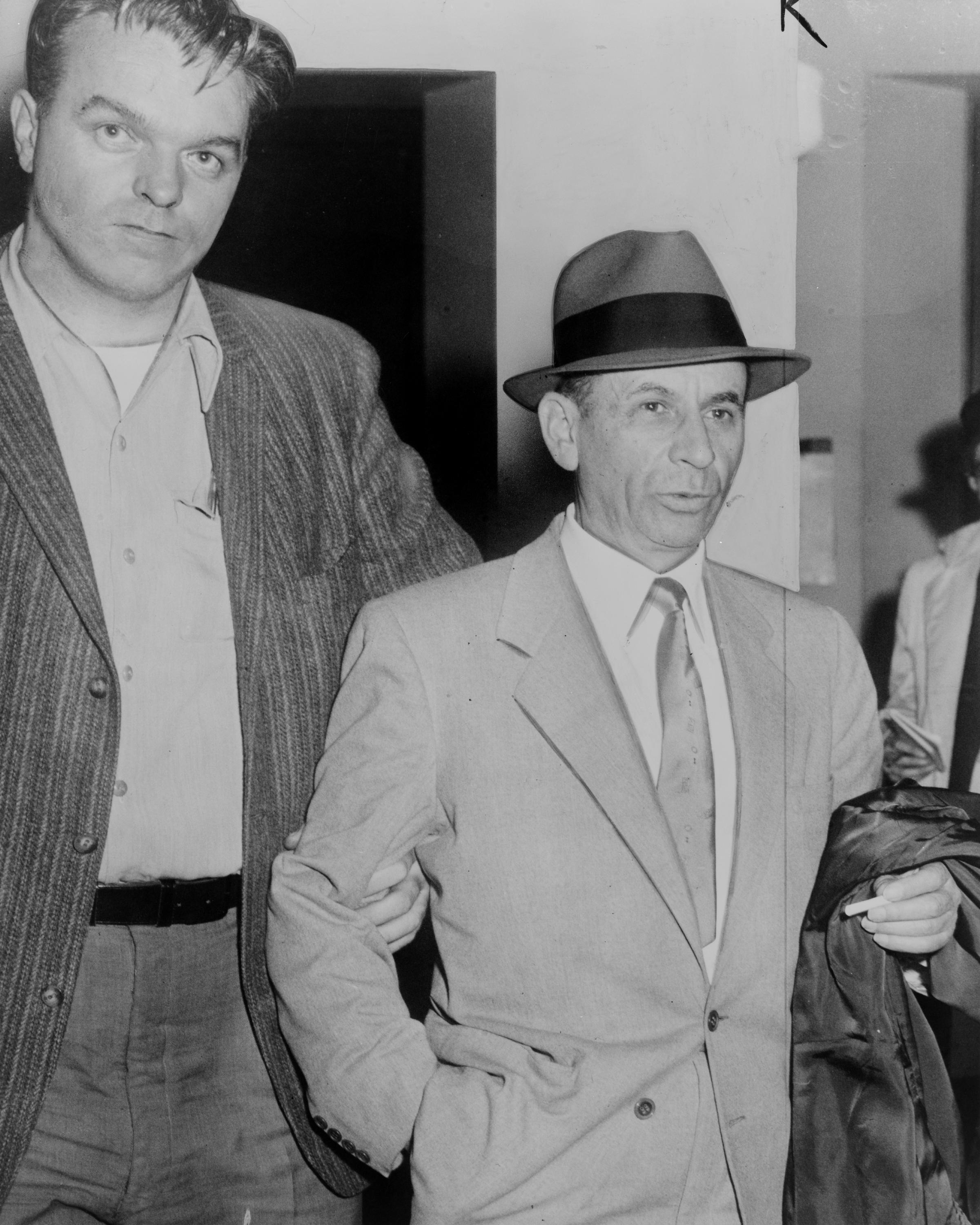
Detective escorting gangster Meyer Lansky to the 54th Street police station in New York City in 1958

Before becoming a police detective, one must attend a law enforcement academy, which provides the officer with a foundation of education with 16 to 24 college units. After graduation from the law enforcement academy, the officer undergoes job training with a field training officer for a period specified by the law enforcement agency and continues to work while on a probationary period, ranging from one to two years.

During the probationary period, the officer is assigned to look for evidence. During this time, the officer is supervised and mentored by a sergeant with years of experience. Some police officers go to a two-year or four-year college or university to get a degree in criminal justice or the management of criminal justice. They can get a concentration or a certificate in a specialized field of criminal investigation at some colleges.

Through years of on-the-job training or college education, officers may participate in a competitive examination, testing their knowledge, skills and abilities regarding criminal investigation, criminal procedure, interview and interrogation, search and seizure, collection and preservation of evidence, investigative report writing, criminal law, court procedure, and providing testimony in court. Competitive examinations are conducted by selected senior law enforcement officials. Following testing, a list of results is provided by the department. At the department's discretion, some or all of the officers on the list are promoted to the rank of detective. Some departments have classes of detectives which increase the detective's rank after successful experience.

Private investigators are licensed by the state in which they work (some states do not require licensing, but most do). In addition to the state examination, applicants testing for a private investigation license must also meet stringent requirements, which include college education, a range of two to four years of full-time investigation experience and the successful adjudication of a criminal and civil background check conducted by state investigators. Private investigators are licensed to conduct civil and criminal investigations in the state in which they are licensed, and are protected by statutes of that state. In states requiring licensing, statutes make it unlawful for any person to conduct a criminal investigation without a license, unless exempted by the statute (i.e., law enforcement officers or agents, attorneys, paralegals, claims adjusters).

=== Vietnam ===
In Vietnam, private detective work is not yet officially recognized by law but is developing due to the demands of modern society. Detective service companies primarily offer investigation and surveillance services for individuals and businesses in matters such as marriage, business fraud, information retrieval, or tracking subjects. The detective profession in Vietnam still lacks a clear legal framework and can easily fall into legal grey areas. However, many detective companies have made efforts to provide professional services, adhering to ethical standards and legal regulations to build trust with clients.

=== India ===
India has no dedicated central legislation specifically regulating private detective agencies. The Private Detective Agencies (Regulation) Bill, 2007, which proposed a licensing framework for such agencies, was withdrawn from the Rajya Sabha on 23 March 2020. In July 2026, the Supreme Court of India identified concerns arising from the use of private investigators to collect evidence, including questions of authorisation, authenticity of photographs and videos, privacy and personal data. The Court directed that a copy of its judgment be sent to the Ministry of Law and Justice and the Law Commission of India to consider the matter.

== See also ==
- Hotel detective
- Inspector
- Investigator (disambiguation)
- Law enforcement agency
- Police rank
- Private investigator
- Police
- Police officer
- Undercover operation
- Spy agent
- Special agent
- Detective fiction
- VALCRI
- Criminal Investigation Department
