= National Neighborhood Watch Program =

American neighborhood watch program

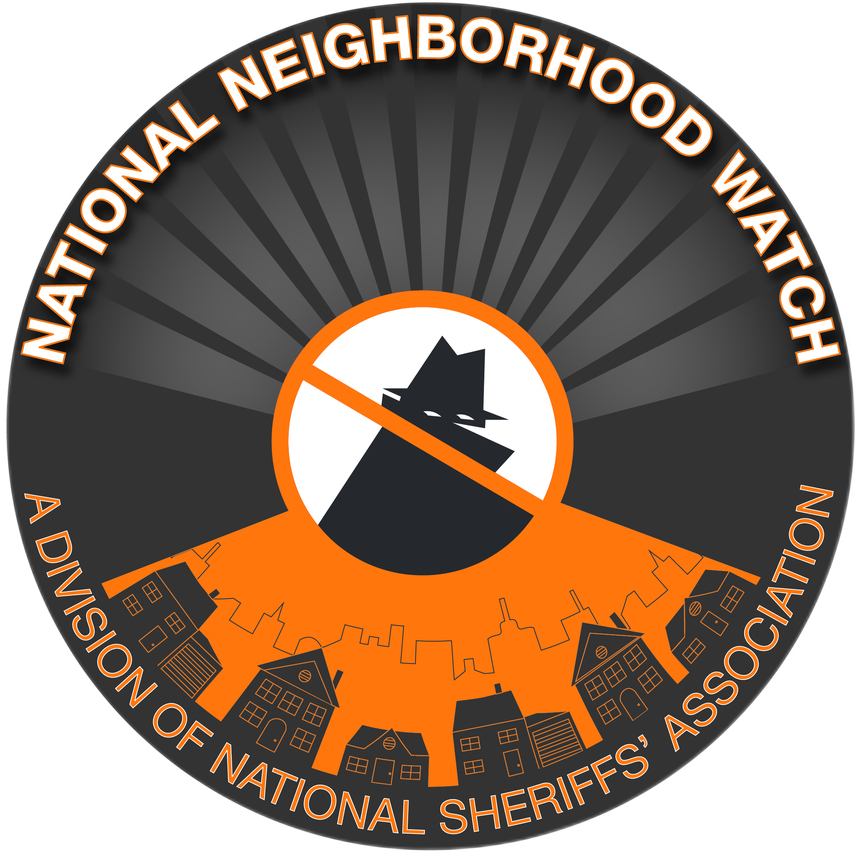
- Formation: 2002
- Purpose: Neighborhood Watch
- Region served: United States
- Parent organization: National Sheriffs' Association
- Website: nnw.org

The National Neighborhood Watch Program (formerly known as USAonWatch) is a neighborhood watch program run under Citizen Corps that focuses on residential areas through citizen involvement. Originally developed in the late 1960s, the National Sheriffs' Association (NSA) officially created the National Neighborhood Watch Program in 1972 to assist citizens and law enforcement.

In 2002, the National Sheriffs' Association in cooperation with USA Freedom Corps, Citizen Corps and the U.S. Department of Justice launched USAonWatch, now renamed National Neighborhood Watch to expand the National Neighborhood Watch initiative beyond its original crime prevention role to assisting and preparing neighborhoods for disasters and with emergency response.

National Neighborhood Watch currently receives funding from the National Sheriffs' Association, the Office of Justice Programs, the Bureau of Justice Assistance, and the U.S. Department of Justice.

USAonWatch Old Logo

== See also ==
- Citizen Corps
- Community Emergency Response Team (CERT)
- Medical Reserve Corps (MRC)
- National Night Out - National Association of Town Watch (NNO), (NATW)
- Neighborhood Watch Programs United States
- Operation Identification
- Project Safe Neighborhoods
- Senkom Mitra Polri (Indonesia)
- Volunteers in Police Service (VIPS)
