= Safety House Program =

Australian child safety organisation

Safety House logo

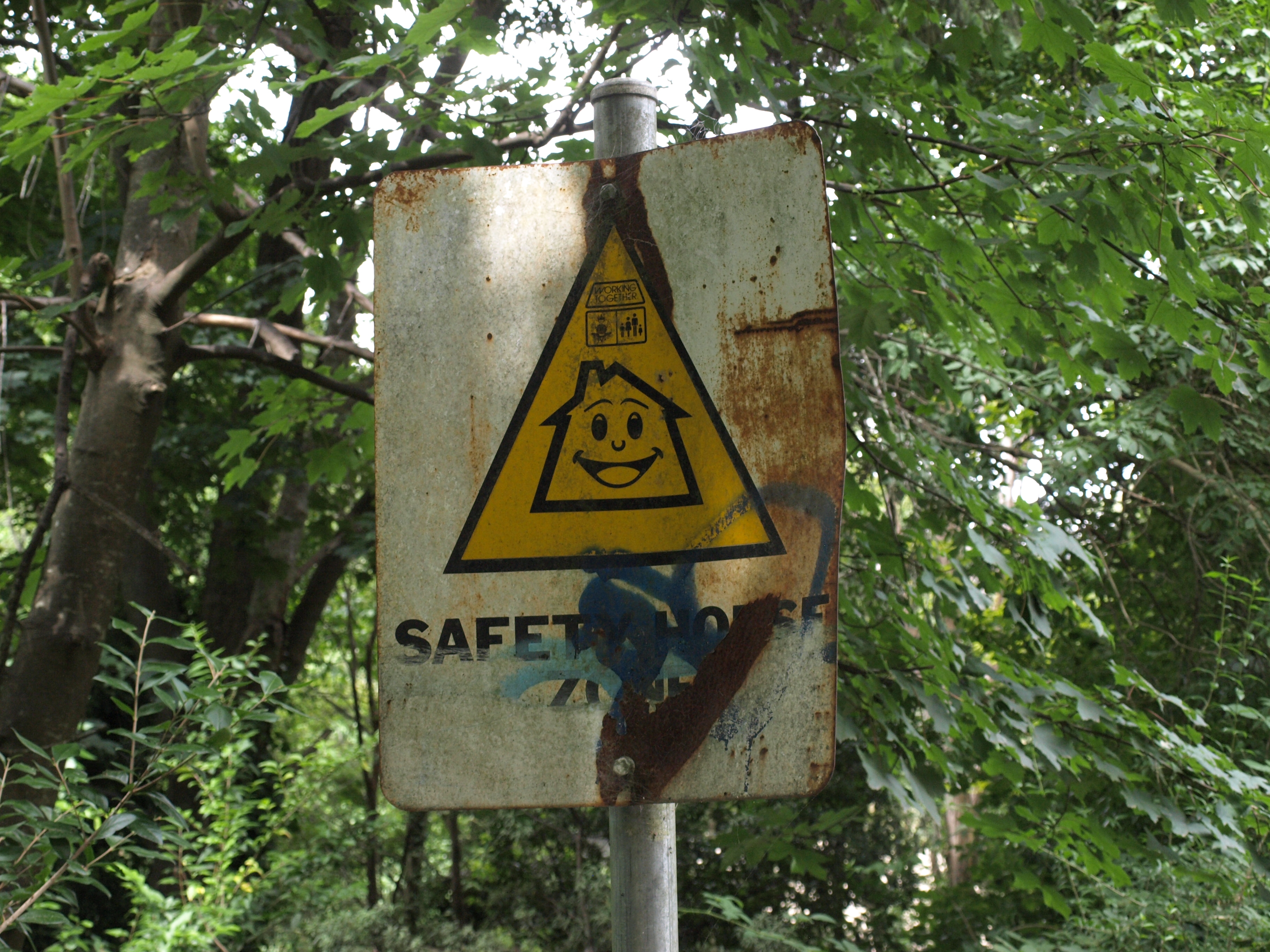
Dilapidated Safety House sign in Victoria

The Safety House Program was a national Australian community based and funded program designed for the safety of children while in transit to and from school. Houses and businesses were selected as safe places for children to seek shelter and safety if required. Applicants had to undergo criminal history checks and other checks such as a home inspection, etc. Its mascot's name was "Ima (Safety House)", who would sometimes visit schools to advertise the program.

== History ==
The program was established in North Dandenong, Victoria, Australia in 1979. New South Wales took up the program in April 1984. Safety Houses were denoted by a square yellow plastic sign featuring the Safety House logo.

The Safety House Program was discontinued in Victoria from 31 July 2013. The organisation cited changing community trends in their decision to wind up the program, such as the greater number of children being driven to school, and the lower number of stay-at-home parents.

In New South Wales the Safety House Program has been discontinued in favour of a new program designed to provide children with simple strategies to help ensure their own personal safety.

As of 2026, the Safety House program still runs independently in Western Australia.

== See also ==
- National Safe Place (US)
- Block Parent Program (Canada)
- Neighbourhood watch
