= Crime in Canada =

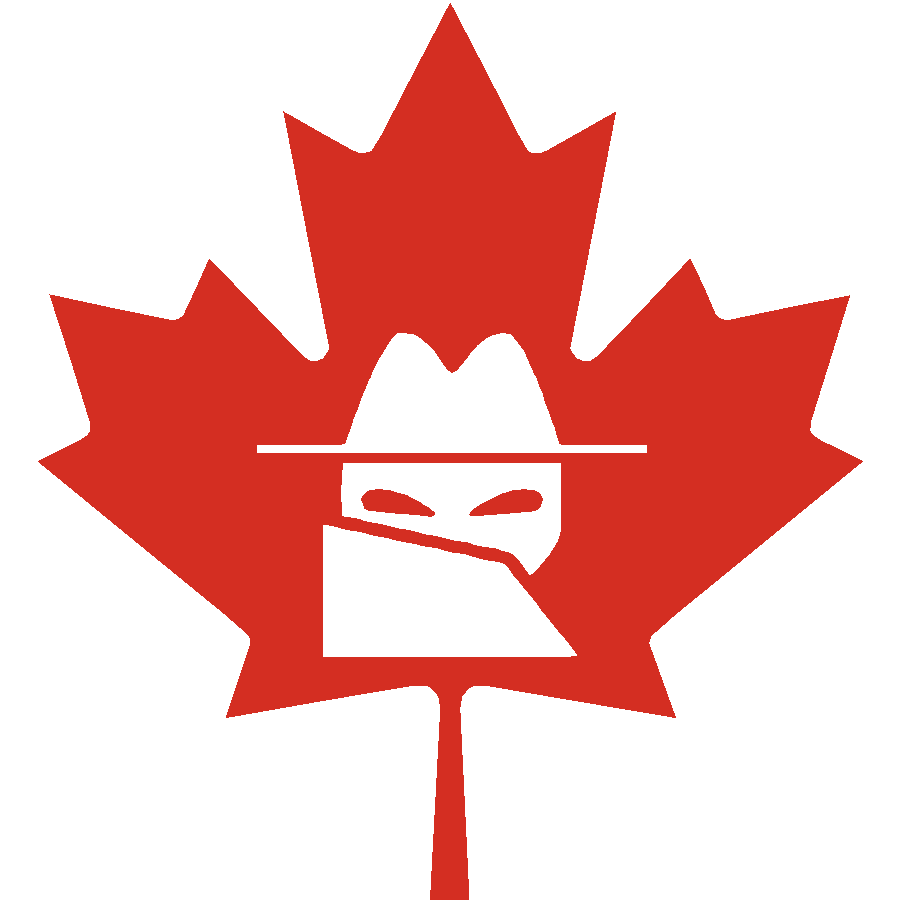
Crime in Canada
- Crime rates* (2022)

Violent Criminal Code violations
- Homicide: 2.25
- Attempted murder: 2.16
- Sexual assault: 90
- Assault: 503
- Robbery: 56
- Uttering threats: 224
- Total violent crime violations: 1,365

Property crime violations
- Breaking and entering: 341
- Theft of motor vehicle: 271
- Theft over $5,000: 62
- Theft under $5,000: 963
- Mischief: 807
- Total property crime violations: 3,314
- Notes *Number of reported crimes per 100,000 population. Census population: 35,151,728 Source: Police-reported crime for selected offences, Canada, 2021 and 2022

Crime in Canada is generally considered low overall. Under the Canadian constitution, the power to establish criminal law & rules of investigation is vested in the federal Parliament. The provinces share responsibility for law enforcement (although provincial policing in many jurisdictions is contracted to the federal Royal Canadian Mounted Police), and while the power to prosecute criminal offences is assigned to the federal government, responsibility for prosecutions is delegated to the provinces for most types of criminal offences. Laws and sentencing guidelines are uniform throughout the country, but provinces vary in their level of enforcement.

According to Statistics Canada, overall crime in Canada had been steadily declining since the mid-20th century, as measured by the Crime Severity Index (CSI) and the Violent Crime Severity Index (VCSI). After crime dropped steadily throughout the 1990s and leveled off between 2000 and 2002, the national crime rate suddenly surged by 6% in 2003. It was the first substantial annual increase Canada had seen in over 10 years and has since generally declined again. Canada's homicide rate peaked in 1975 at around 3.03 per 100,000 people and dropped substantially (by over 40%) in the decades that followed, sitting at roughly 1.98 per 100,000 by 2023, although a more recent uptick since an all-time crime low in 2014 has been recorded in some years. Both measures of crime saw an 8% to 10% decrease between 2010 and 2018. Violent crime, specifically homicide, has declined in Canada by over 40% since its peak in 1975, placing Canada 95th in the world by homicide rate—far worse than Australia, England, France and Ireland, and relatively close to poorer European countries. Rates of homicide incidents remain considerably higher in the United States (5.7 homicides per 100,000 population) than in Canada (1.9 per 100,000).

While the overall volume of crime dropped dramatically since its peak in the 1970s and more broadly since the 1990s, Canada's crime volumes have shown a more complicated trajectory in recent years.

More current crimes that are increasing include drug-related offences, fraud, sexual assault and theft, with fraud increasing 46% between 2008 and 2018. The Crime Severity Index (CSI) in Canada rose by 2% in 2023, marking the third consecutive year of increase and the continuation of a trend that began in 2015. The overall increase was significantly influenced by a rise in reported fraud, which was still identified as a major factor, extortion and child pornography cases, which soared by 52% in 2023. According to the Institute for Economics & Peace Global Peace Index, Canada is ranked the 11th safest country in the world out of 163 countries.

== Statistics ==
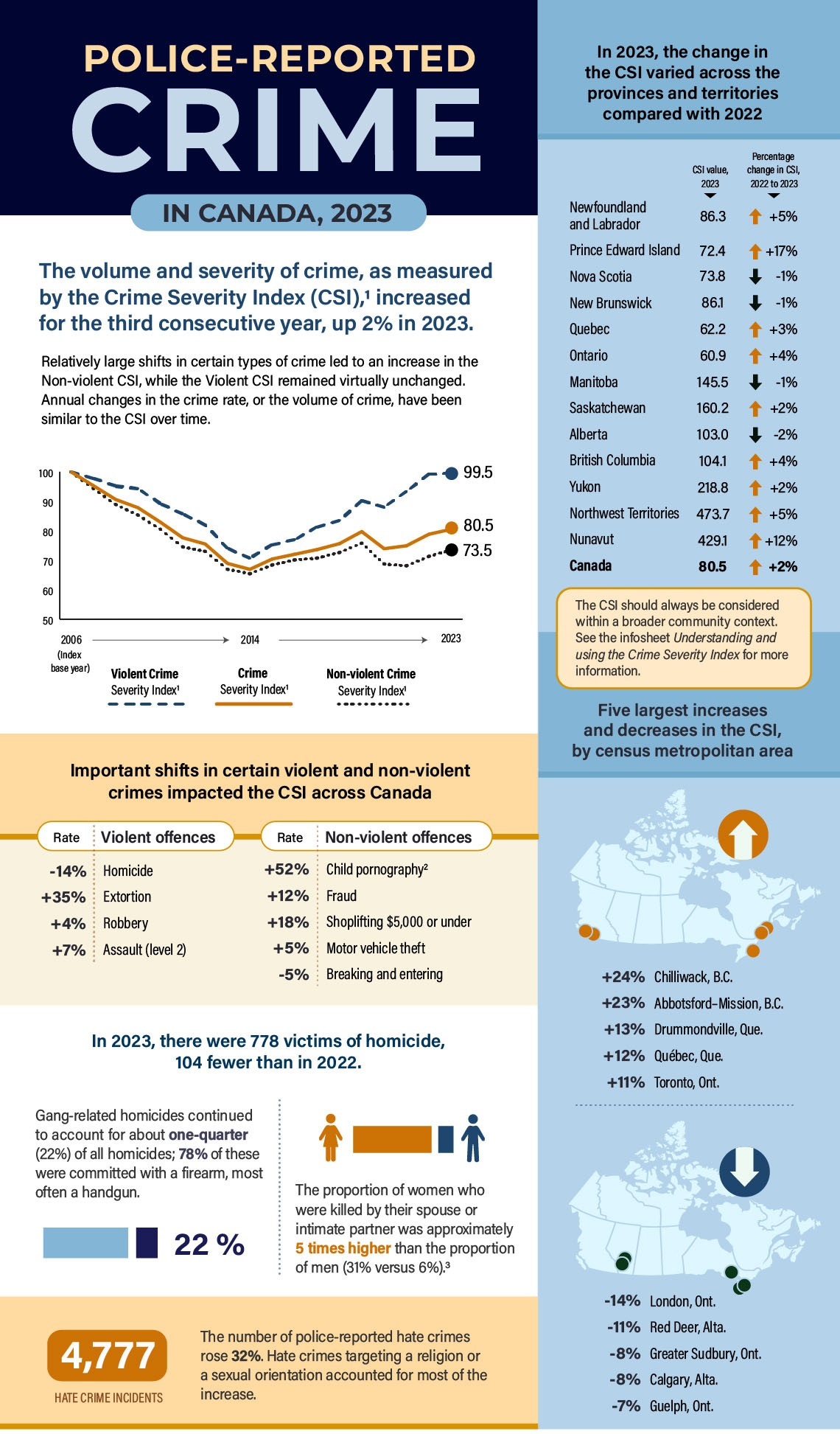
Overall crimes

The Crime Severity Index (CSI) in Canada rose by 2% in 2023, marking the third consecutive year of increase and the continuation of a trend that began in 2015. The increase was largely attributed to significant shifts in certain types of crime, particularly in the Non-violent CSI, while the Violent CSI saw minimal change. Data showed that the police-reported crime rate per 100,000 people was 5,843 in 2023, reflecting a 2.5% annual change. Both the Violent Crime Severity Index and the Non-violent Crime Severity Index recorded values of 99.5 and 73.5, respectively.

The overall increase in the CSI was significantly influenced by a rise in reported child pornography cases, which soared by 52% in 2023. The increase was deemed partly due to enhanced awareness and better collaboration among law enforcement agencies. Other contributors to the CSI included increases in fraud and shoplifting rates, with fraud rising by 12% and shoplifting of amounts under $5,000 rising by 18%.

Conversely, some crime types saw a decline, including breaking and entering, which dropped by 5%, continuing a slow decline observed since the 1990s. While the Violent CSI remained virtually unchanged, the police reported lower rates of homicide and sexual offenses against children, with a decrease of 14% in homicide rates compared to the previous year.

Several crime types emphasized in the report include fraud, which was identified as a major factor, and extortion, rising by 35% for the fourth consecutive year. Despite the rise in reported incidents, many cases of fraud remain unreported. Reports indicated that only about 11% of fraud victims decided to notify the authorities.

The statistics also highlighted the changing landscape of theft-related crimes, as motor vehicle theft and robbery rates saw increases. Notably, while motor vehicle theft has risen by 5% from the previous year, the rate remains about 50% lower than it was 25 years ago. Relationships to robbery showed a similar trend, with a 4% rise in incidents but still being lower than historical figures from years ago.

=== Homicide ===
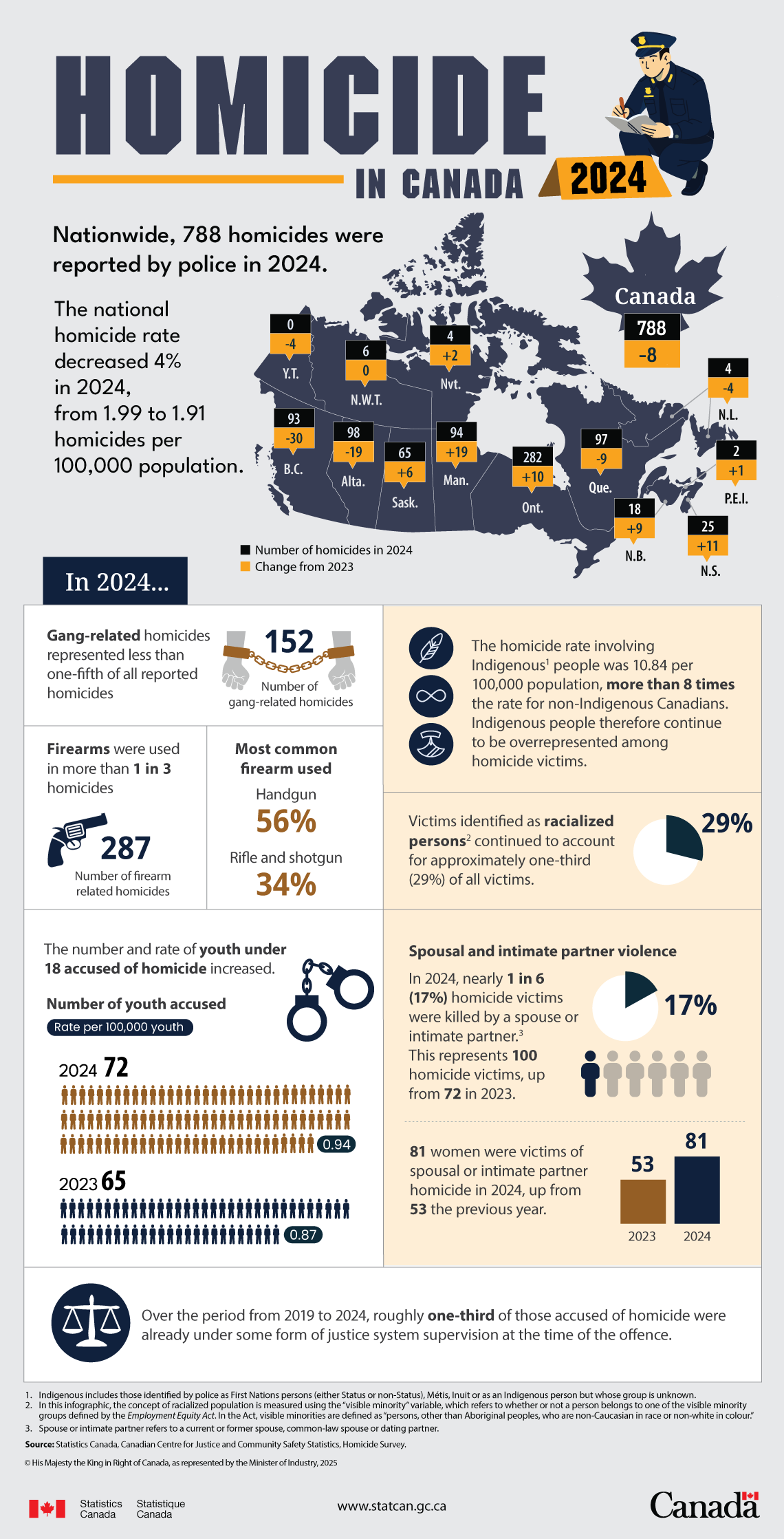
Homicides

In 2024, Canada reported a total of 788 homicides, reflecting a 4% decrease in the national homicide rate, from 1.99 to 1.91 per 100,000 population. The breakdown of homicides by province shows significant variability, with Ontario having the highest number at 282, while Yukon recorded none. In total, gang-related homicides made up less than 20% of the overall count, amounting to 152 cases. Firearms were involved in over a third of all homicides, with handguns being the most common weapon used, accounting for 56%.

Youth under 18 accused of homicide increased, with 72 cases in 2024, compared to 65 in 2023. The homicide rate for Indigenous people was notably high at 10.84 per 100,000, showing a continued overrepresentation among victims. Racialized individuals constituted about 29% of all homicide victims. From 2019 to 2024, around one-third of those accused of homicide were already under some form of justice system supervision..

In terms of intimate partner violence, 17% of homicide victims were killed by spouses or partners, totaling 100 victims, an increase from 72 in 2023. This included 81 women, up from 53 the previous year. The report highlights ongoing trends and concerns in homicide statistics across Canada, illustrating issues related to violence, particularly against vulnerable groups..

=== By province and territory ===
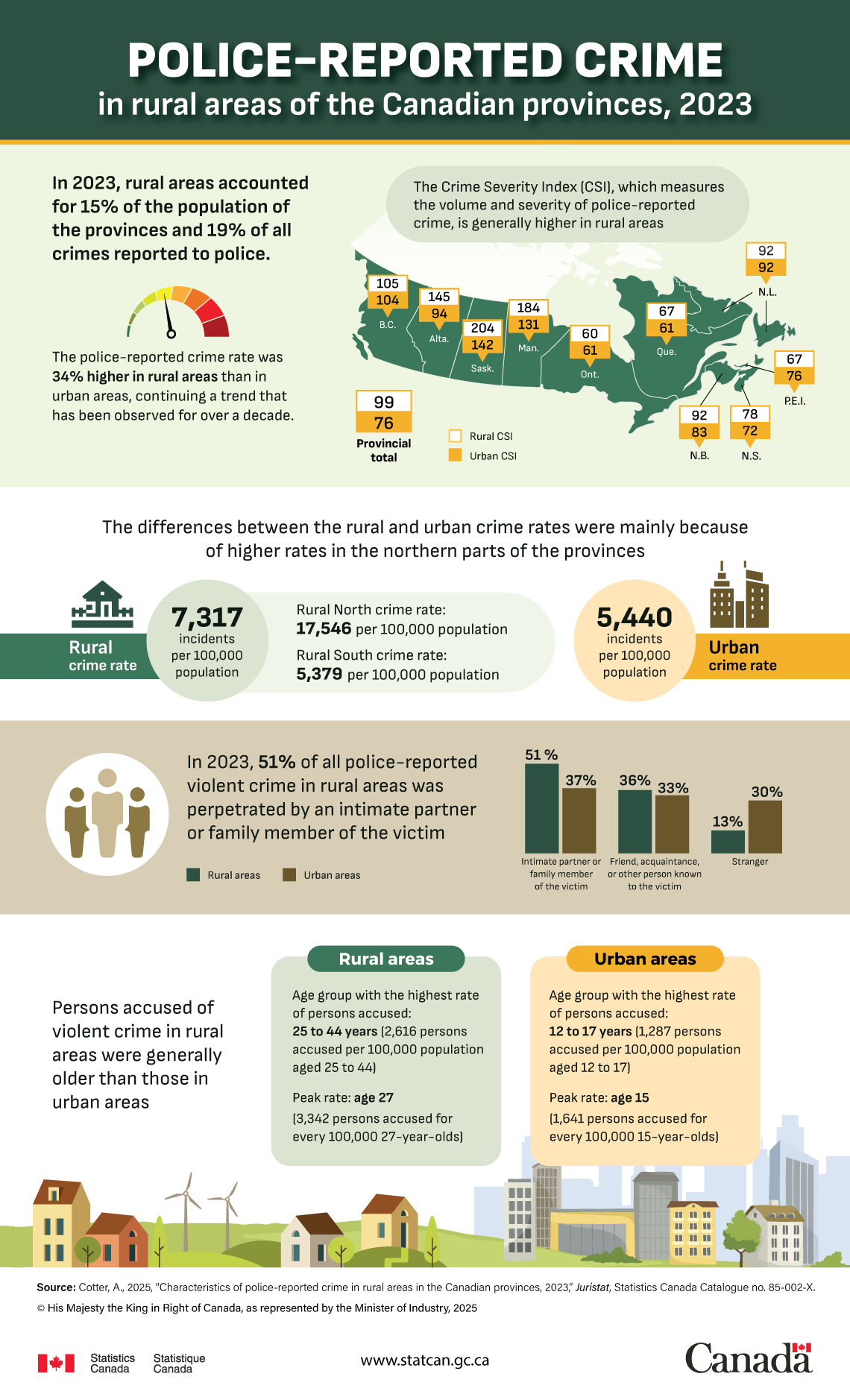
Overall crimes

Crime statistics vary considerably through different parts of Canada. In general, the eastern provinces have the lowest violent crime rates while the western provinces have higher rates and the territories higher still. Of the provinces, Manitoba and Saskatchewan have the highest violent crime rates.

In Newfoundland and Labrador, the 2023 Crime Severity Index was 86.3, experiencing a 5.1% increase. The police-reported crime rate for the province stood at 7,175, also rising by 5.0%. Similar trends were noted across various provinces, with notable increases in other areas including Prince Edward Island, Nova Scotia, and New Brunswick, while some areas like Nova Scotia reported a slight decrease in their Crime Severity Index.

Saskatchewan has the highest provincial assault rate, and that Manitoba has the highest provincial sexual assault rate, robbery rate and homicide rate of any Canadian province. In many instances the crime rates in the Yukon, Northwest Territories and Nunavut are the highest in the country and can be up to ten times the national average.

In 2023, rural areas in Canada represented 15% of the provincial population and accounted for 19% of all reported crimes. The crime rate in these areas was 34% higher than in urban areas, continuing a long-standing trend. The Crime Severity Index (CSI), which reflects the seriousness of crime, is generally higher in rural regions.

The data showed notable differences in crime rates, largely due to higher rates in northern provinces. The rural crime rate was 7,317 incidents per 100,000 people, with the northern rural crime rate being significantly higher at 17,546, compared to 5,379 in rural southern areas and 5,440 in urban areas. In rural regions, 51% of police-reported violent crimes were committed by someone close to the victim, such as an intimate partner or family member.

The age profile of individuals accused of violent crimes also differed between rural and urban areas. In rural settings, the highest rates of accused individuals were in the 25 to 44 age group, peaking at age 27. Conversely, the highest rates in urban areas were among those aged 12 to 17, peaking at age 15.

=== Violent crime severity index by census metropolitan area ===
CMAs in Canada – Violent Crime Severity Index, by year
City	2020	2019	2016	2015	2014	2013	2012	2011	2010	2009		
Abbotsford–Mission	77.2	86.4	82.3	90.4	81.1	70.7	79.7	72.4	89.8	118.8		
Barrie	44.9	53.1	46.3	43.8	42.3	38.6	46.1	49.2	50.1	53.9		
Brantford	80.8	83.4	88.4	70.0	73.5	73.9	67.6	84.5	92.5	91.5		
Calgary	78.0	92.9	61.3	72.1	63.0	62.0	61.2	72.1	82.1	84.8		
Edmonton	104.8	114.9	102.5	103.9	93.3	89.7	95.8	105.9	106	118.7		
Gatineau	51.4	55.8	63.8	55.9	57.5	65.1	71.4	68.1	59.7	74.5		
Greater Sudbury	87.8	82.1	61.4	63.9	62.9	66.3	75.4	78.7	85	98.1		
Guelph	63.1	64.6	49.1	47.3	44.1	42.5	53.8	48.2	44.5	49.2		
Halifax	64.3	60.7	60.2	77.3	79.0	73.6	84.8	92.4	111.7	105.6	120.0	
Hamilton	55.5	66.0	54.6	55.0	59.9	62.5	75.8	80.9	84.3			
Kelowna	111.9	121.4	62.7	69.8	60.4	67.1	81.8	86.0	95.9	104.3		
Kingston	70.6	67.8	38.5	54.5	44.3	48.6	53.7	48.1	54.5	71.9		
Kitchener–Cambridge–Waterloo	74.7	73.3	60.1	54.5	51.1	57.0	60.9	69.5	69.8	65.1		
London	74.7	75.1	59.4	56.7	49.0	56.9	64.1	70.5	74.3	69.9		
Moncton	104.2	108.9	79.3	75.6	74.5	66.5	73.4	68.2	72.4	79.4		
Montreal	52.7	58.0	73.1	76.1	72.5	79.5	87.8	97.7	98.3	102.7		
Ottawa	48.3	57.0	62.1	53.7	49.6	56.1	58.2	63.9	67.5	78.1		
Peterborough	62.1	54.4	68.9	56.9	51.7	57.7	66.2	60.2	65.8	59.5		
Quebec	41.81	43.1	47.5	48.3	50.8	48.6	51.3	50.9				
Regina	104.8	130.0	124.1	107.9	103.8	105.8	110.1	123.5	151.2	155.6		
Saguenay	67.7	47.7	61.3	58.2	57.2	79.4	55.2	59.2	72.8			
Saint John	43.9	56.1	49.3	64.3	63.8	65.7	61.6	59.5	68.0	91.3	96.4	100.3
Saskatoon	105.7	117.3	114.0	113.5	122.6	109.9	126.4	134.5	155.7	154.7		
Sherbrooke	47.8	47.2	55.6	44.1	51.6	45.3	49.7	49.3	N/A	54.2		
St. Catharines–Niagara	58.1	64.3	37.6	42.2	40.9	49.3	54.1	48.0	56.9	63.5		
St. John's	88.9	71.3	79.6	69.5	79.5	77.3	74.7	90.1	69.3			
Thunder Bay	93.8	100.6	125.6	119.2	138.5	110.9	118.8	128.7	138.5	136.1		
Toronto	46.2	54.2	70.4	64.6	63.5	68.2	78.4	84.7	88.4	94.5		
Trois-Rivières	47.7	51.8	46.2	59.9	57.3	51.4	46.4	46.2	44.4	56.0		
Vancouver	88.6	95.4	77.8	85.0	78.2	83.6	92.6	98.3	108.2	117.8		
Victoria	75.8	74.3	56.8	69.1	58.4	54.4	63.7	70.9	81.3	81.0		
Windsor	83.3	80.3	58.1	67.7	57.0	61.9	66.4	59.8	65.1	74.6		
Winnipeg	116.3	131.7	149.6	122.1	116.1	119.9	145.4	173.8	163.9	187.0		
Canada	73.4	79.5	75.3	74.5	70.2	73.7	81.4	85.3	88.9	93.7		

== Police ==
Map of police per 100,000 population across Canada, 2012: < 176 176-200 201-300 301-400 > 400

In 2005, there were 61,050 police officers in Canada which equates to one police officer per 528.6 persons, but with significant regional variations. Newfoundland and Labrador and Prince Edward Island have the fewest police per capita with 664.9 and 648.4 persons per police officer, respectively. Conversely, the highest ratio of police to population is found in Canada's northern territories; Nunavut has 247.9 persons per police officer, the Northwest Territories has 248.5 persons per officer and the Yukon has 258.2 persons for each police officer.

That is a substantially lower rate than most developed countries with only Japan and Sweden having so few police officers. The United States has one officer per 411.5 persons, and Germany 344.8.

Canada's national police force is the Royal Canadian Mounted Police (RCMP) which is the main police force in Canada's north, and in rural areas except in Quebec, Ontario, and Newfoundland. Those three provinces have their own provincial police forces, although the RCMP still operate throughout rural Newfoundland and also provide specific federal policing services in Ontario and Quebec. Many cities and districts have their own municipal police forces, while others have contracts with the provincial police or RCMP to police their communities.

== Comparisons ==
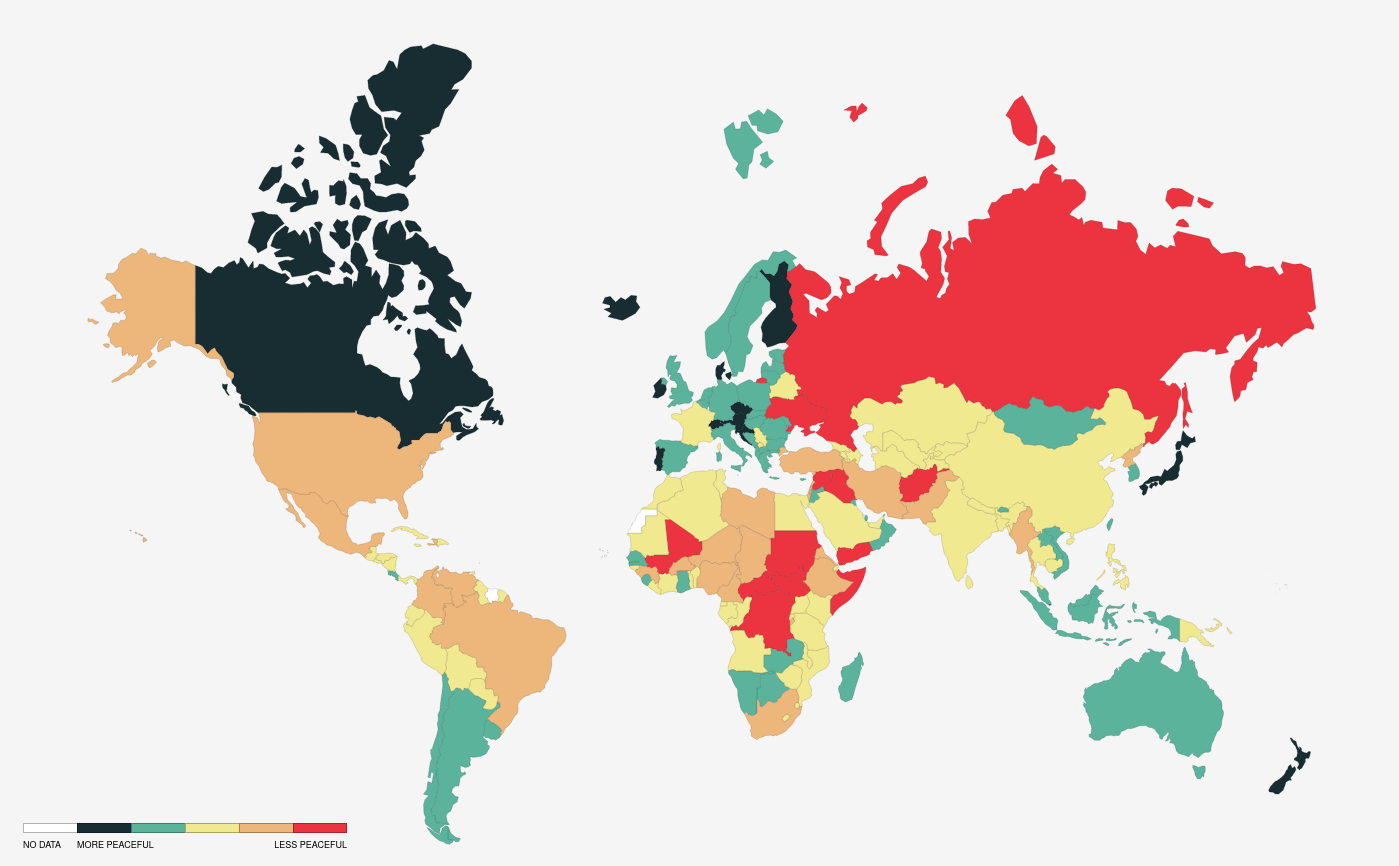
Global Peace Index 2023. Countries appearing with a deeper shade of green are ranked as more peaceful, countries appearing more red are ranked as more violent.

Comparing crime rates between countries is difficult due to the differences in jurisprudence, reporting and crime classifications. National crime statistics are in reality statistics of only selected crime types. Data are collected through various surveying methods that have previously ranged between 15% and 100% coverage of the data. A 2001 Statistics Canada study concluded that comparisons with the U.S. on homicide rates were the most reliable. Comparison of rates for six lesser incident crimes was considered possible but subject to more difficulty of interpretation. For example, types of assaults receive different classifications and laws in Canada and the U.S., making comparisons more difficult than homicides. At the time, the U.S. crime of aggravated assault could be compared to the sum of three Canadian crimes (aggravated assault, assault with a weapon, and attempted murder). This comparison had a predicted bias that would inflate the Canadian numbers by only 0.1%. The study also concluded that directly comparing the two countries' reported total crime rate (i.e. total selected crimes) was "inappropriate" since the totals include the problem data sets as well as the usable sets. For reasons like these, homicides have been favored in international studies looking for predictors of crime rates (predictors like economic inequality).

Crime Comparison Between Selected Countries (Reported crimes per 100,000 population)
Country	Homicide	Robbery	Sexual Assault	Statistics Year
Canada	1.6	79.4	62.9	2012
Australia	1.3	63.3	80.1	2011
England and Wales	1.0	119.3	78.2	2012
Ireland	1.0	61.1	39.7	2011
New Zealand	0.9	47.1	76.5	2012
Northern Ireland	1.5	72.6	88.9	2010/2011
Scotland	1.7	34.9	85.1	2012/2013
South Africa	30.1	297.5		2012
United States of America	4.5	102.2	110	2014

=== United States ===
Among 15 high-income countries, the U.S. has both the highest homicide rate, and the largest number of homicides (chart shows homicide data for 2021 in selected countries).

Much study has been done of the comparative experience and policies of Canada with its southern neighbour the United States, and this is a topic of intense discussion within Canada.

Over the past 25 years, the rates of police-reported violent crime in Canada and the United States have changed. The violent crime rate in the U. S. remains higher than in Canada by 33% in 2023. However, the gap is narrowing because violent crime rates in the U. S. have decreased by 37% since 1998, while Canada’s rate increased by 22% during the same time frame. Major assaults are the main contributor to violent crime in both countries, making up 79% of such incidents in the U.S. and 78% in Canada.

Police reported property crime rates have also become more similar, with Canada's rate in 2023 at 1,995 incidents per 100,000 people, slightly higher than the U.S. rate of 1,906. This pattern corresponds with the late 1990s and early 2000s when both countries had similar property crime rates. Canada had a lower reported property crime rate from the mid-2000s to mid-2010s, but have since aligned due to changes in theft trends.

The homicide rate is considerably higher in the U. S., with 5.7 homicides per 100,000 in 2023, compared to 1.9 in Canada. This ratio has remained steady, primarily due to firearm-related homicides, which account for 76% of U. S. homicides, while only 38% in Canada. Both countries have seen declines in their homicide rates since their peaks; Canada’s rate decreased by 33% and the U. S. rate by 44%.

Younger individuals are more likely to be homicide victims in both nations, with those under 40 constituting half of the population but 59% of victims in Canada and 66% in the U. S. Males are drastically overrepresented among homicide victims, particularly among young adults.

Robbery trends have shown similar declines in both countries, with a more significant drop in the U. S. However, Canada has generally seen higher rates of break and enters, even though recent trends show declines in both countries, with Canada’s reduction happening faster since the 1990s.

== See also ==
- Crime Stoppers
- Block Parent Program
- Gangs in Canada
- List of law enforcement officers killed in the line of duty in Canada
- List of mass shootings in Canada
- List of unsolved murders in Canada
- Violence against women in Canada
