= Natural surveillance =

Crime prevention model

Natural surveillance is a term used in crime prevention through environmental design (CPTED) models for crime prevention. Natural surveillance limits the opportunity for crime by taking steps to increase the perception that people can be seen. Natural surveillance occurs by designing the placement of physical features, activities and people in such a way as to maximize visibility and foster positive social interaction. Potential offenders feel increased scrutiny and perceive few escape routes. Natural surveillance is typically free of cost, however its effectiveness to deter crime varies with the individual offender.

The CPTED models rely on the ability to influence offender decisions preceding criminal acts. Research into criminal behavior demonstrates that the decision to offend or not to offend is more influenced by cues to the perceived risk of being caught than by cues to reward or ease of entry. Consistent with this research CPTED-based strategies emphasize enhancing the perceived risk of detection and apprehension.

== History ==
Jane Jacobs, North American editor, urban activist, urban planning critic, and author of The Death and Life of Great American Cities (1961), formulated the natural surveillance strategy — eyes on the street, as she called it — based on her work in New York's Greenwich Village.

== Mechanism ==
As people are moving around an area, they will be able to observe what is going on around them, provided the area is open and well lit. Supporting a diversity of uses within a public space is highly effective. Other ways to promote natural surveillance include low landscaping, street lights, street designs that encourage pedestrian use, removing hiding and lurking places, and placing high risk targets, such as expensive or display items, in plain view of legitimate users, such as near a receptionist or sales clerk.

Included in the design are features that maximize visibility of people, parking areas and building entrances: doors and windows that look out on to streets and parking areas, see-through barriers (glass walls, picket fences), pedestrian-friendly sidewalks and streets, and front porches. Designing nighttime lighting is particularly important; uniform high intensity "carpet" lighting of large areas is discouraged, especially where lights glare into (and discourage) observers eyes. In its place is feature lighting that draws the observer's focus to access control points and potential hiding areas. Area lighting is still used, but with shielded and cut-off luminaries to control glare. Light sources are typically placed lower to the ground, at a higher density, and with lower intensity than the lighting it is designed to replace.

Any architectural design that increases the chance that a potential offender will be seen is a form of natural surveillance. Often it is not just that the offender might be seen that matters; that the offender thinks they will be seen can deter crime.

A 2025 study found evidence suggestive of an "eyes on the street" deterrence effect for crime in Chicago. The study found that a program that improved housing in distressed neighborhoods led to increased occupancy of the housing, which in turn was correlated with substantial declines in crime in those neighborhoods.

== See also ==
- Neighborhood watch
- Physical security
- Security lighting
- Surveillance
- Urban vitality
