= Priority board =

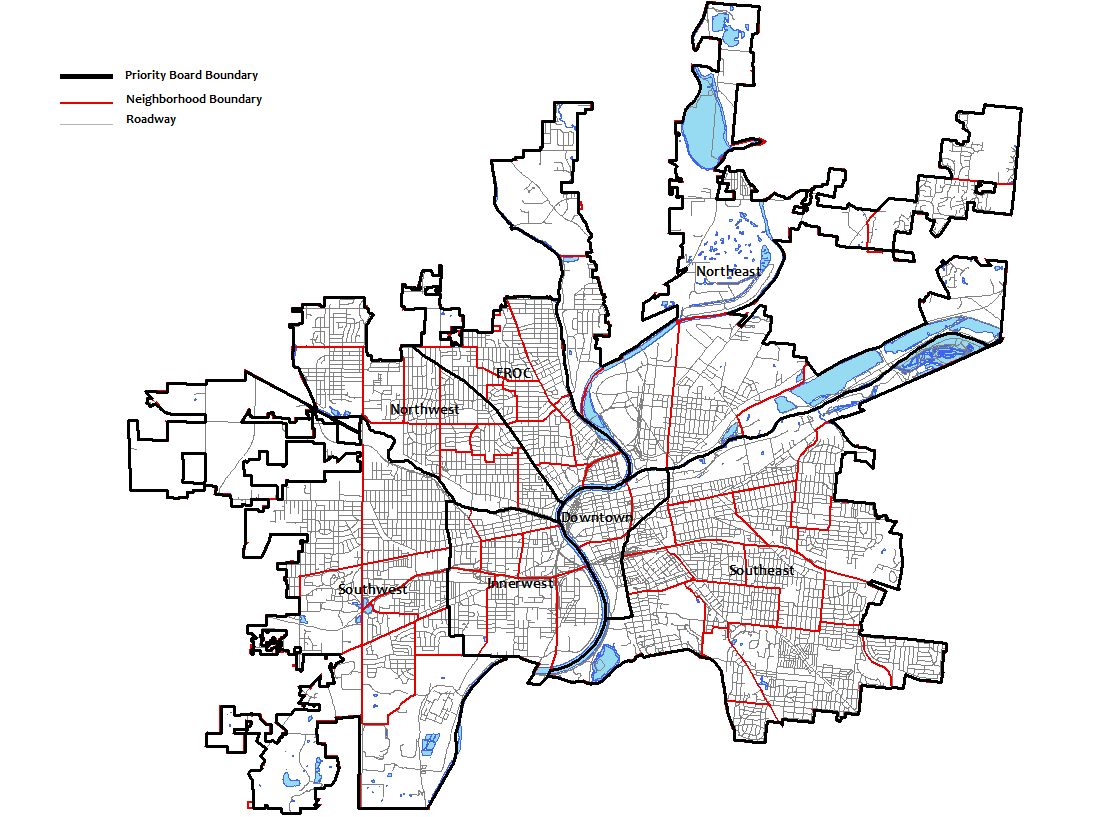
Boundaries of the Dayton, Ohio Priority Board Districts

A priority board is a group of elected citizen volunteers who meet on a regular basis to address neighborhood concerns and to take action to improve the quality of their neighborhoods. They often act as the official citizen voice for their neighborhoods, and advise the city on neighborhood concerns and problems. The priority board members take a role in planning and make recommendations to the city for development, revitalization, and the allocation of city funds.

In Dayton, Ohio there are seven Priority Boards: Downtown, Fair River Oaks Council, Innerwest, Northwest, Northeast, Southeast and Southwest.

== See also ==
- Citizen Observer
- Neighborhood watch
