= Operation Identification =

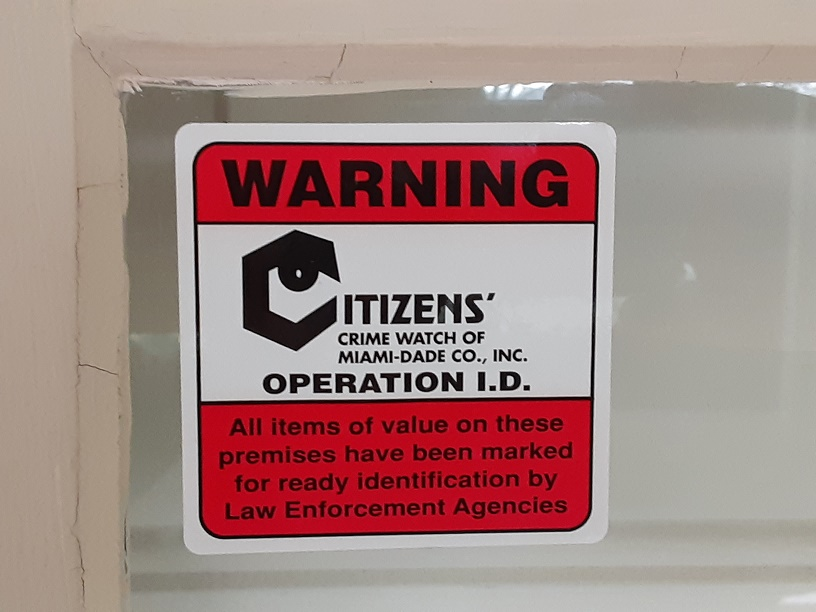
Operation ID decal in Miami-Dade, FL

Operation Identification (or Operation ID) is a national community policing initiative in the United States that aims to deter property theft and facilitate the recovery of stolen property by encouraging citizens to mark valuable property with traceable identifiers, record serial numbers, and post warning signs.

== History ==
The first documented Operation ID program began in 1963 in Monterey Park, California. The Chief of Police loaned citizens electronic etching equipment to mark their driver's license numbers onto property and register the property in a police database. Citizens then posted stickers around their house broadcasting their participation in Operation ID to would-be thieves. By 1972, the city reported that more than half of its approximately 11,000 homeowners were participating in the program and that the vast majority of burglaries were occurring in homes not participating in the program.

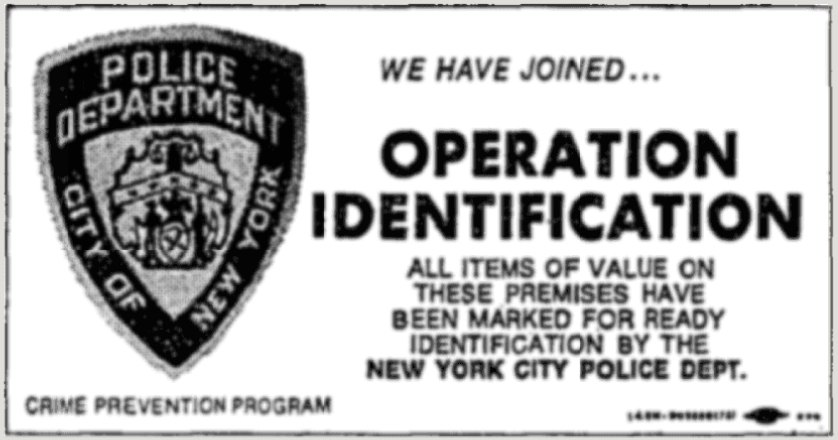
N.Y.P.D. Operation ID decal

The success of the Monterey Park program led to hundreds of other American and international law enforcement agencies adopting similar programs over the next decade. In 1972, New York City, then the largest city in the United States, adopted an Operation ID program, encouraging residents to borrow city-issued tools to etch their Social Security numbers into their valuable property. Los Angeles developed an Operation ID program using adhesive labels.

In the 1970s, the United States federal government began a nationwide effort to encourage and support Operation ID programs, declaring it a major component of burglary reduction. The federal government spent more than $100 million on research and development, granting local programs funding for personnel and equipment. Civic organizations and insurance companies also joined the effort and encouraged Operation ID programs in their communities. Many insurance agents lent engraving tools and gave out window stickers to homeowners for free. The FBI allowed local law enforcement agencies to enter Operation ID owner-applied identifiers into the FBI's National Crime Information Center database. By 1974, the Department of Justice estimated more than 80 percent of American police departments had an Operation ID program.

In 1977, FBI Director Clarence M. Kelley supported the creation of a National Committee on Operation Identification, composed of representatives from the National Sheriffs' Association, the International Association of Chiefs of Police, and the Department of Justice, to promote Operation ID programs and recommend national standards.

Modernly, Operation ID has not resulted in widespread public awareness or adoption, but many law enforcement agencies and universities still operate Operation ID programs.

== Community policing ==
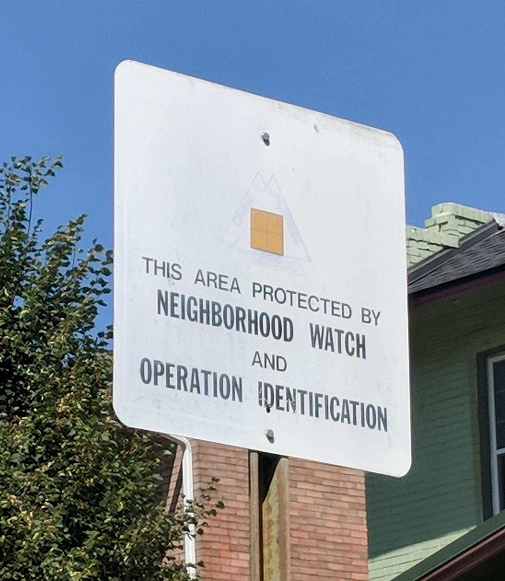
Neighborhood Watch and Operation ID sign in Denver, CO

Beyond reducing property crime, one of the explicit goals of most Operation ID programs is to promote community relations with law enforcement. One of the early adopter police chiefs explained:

Throughout this entire program, we have involved as many members of the community as possible in the participation of local law enforcement. ... Should this program fail, we will have at least exposed a large group of citizens in this city to its police service and to the many problems of law enforcement.

The National Neighborhood Watch Program began in 1972, shortly after Operation ID. Operation ID became a standard component of Neighborhood Watch programs.

== Asset management ==
Operation ID programs rely on the asset management strategies of tracking property and tracing ownership.

Modernly, most asset management programs based on Operation ID track property using product serial numbers or unique owner-assigned numbers affixed or etched into property, with ownership information recorded in a database that may or may not be registered with law enforcement.

== See also ==
- Neighborhood Watch
