= Neighbourhood action group =

A Neighbourhood Action Group, or NAG, is a UK initiative, set up to deal with key issues identified by a community's first public consultation. The group is coordinated by the police. This may happen in the form of a public meeting, through surveys done face-to-face or by mail, or a combination of methods.

NAGs are volunteer working groups made up of representatives from the community. They will include residents, the police, local authority and other organisations, such as local businesses and schools. Ideally NAGs represent a cross section of the society they represent, including representatives from groups such as neighbourhood watch schemes and local councils.

They are key to the success of neighbourhood policing as it is this group which will plan on behalf of the community and organise for tasks to be completed. In effect, they are the 'doers', accountable locally for responding to problems a community wants to tackle.

== NAG Members ==
The NAG constitution suggests the following should be invited to join the NAG:

- Residents including young people
- Parish and Ward Councillors
- Representatives from the business community
- Neighbourhood Watch co-ordinators
- Local policing team including Police community support officers (PCSO)

== Priority Profiles ==
Every NAG has three priority profiles — priorities for the neighbourhood policing team to address, with the assistance of NAG members. These are reviewed annually and those outside of the NAG are invited to contribute.
