= Senkom Mitra Polri =

Indonesian community policing group

- Abbreviation: Senkom Mitra Polri
- Formation: January 1, 2004
- Legal status: Non-Governmental Organization
- Purpose: Social and security public order
- Headquarters: DKI Jakarta, Indonesia
- Location: Indonesia
- Region served: Indonesia
- Members: 2 million
- Official language: Indonesian
- Website: www.senkom.or.id

The Indonesian National Police Partners Communication Center (Sentra Komunikasi Mitra Kepolisian Negara Republik Indonesia, abbreviated and commonly known as Senkom Mitra Polri) are neighborhood watch groups in Indonesia that inform and assist the members of Indonesian National Police (Polri) in providing information and reporting any kind of public threats to the law enforcement.

Senkom Mitra Polri is a non-government organization established by members of the Security and Order Partners of the Police Headquarters on January 1, 2004, in Jakarta, Indonesia.

== Scope and Activities ==
As a police partner, Senkom coordinates and provides information to the legal authorities of either the central government, local government, or the military police about security or public order disturbances, matters of national stability, and any natural disasters occurring in areas where Senkom members are located.

Senkom Mitra Polri's activities include:

- Monitoring the weather, traffic, situation reports by the Kamtibmas.
- Cooperating with the government agencies in training and socialization of human resources.
- Providing hands-on service and communications assistance in the event of disasters, accidents, and safety demonstrations.

== See also ==
- National Neighborhood Watch Program
- Neighborhood watch
