= National Safe Place =

U.S. non-profit organization

- Formation: 1983
- Headquarters: Louisville, Kentucky
- Website: https://www.nationalsafeplace.org

The original Safe Place logo, retired in 2013.

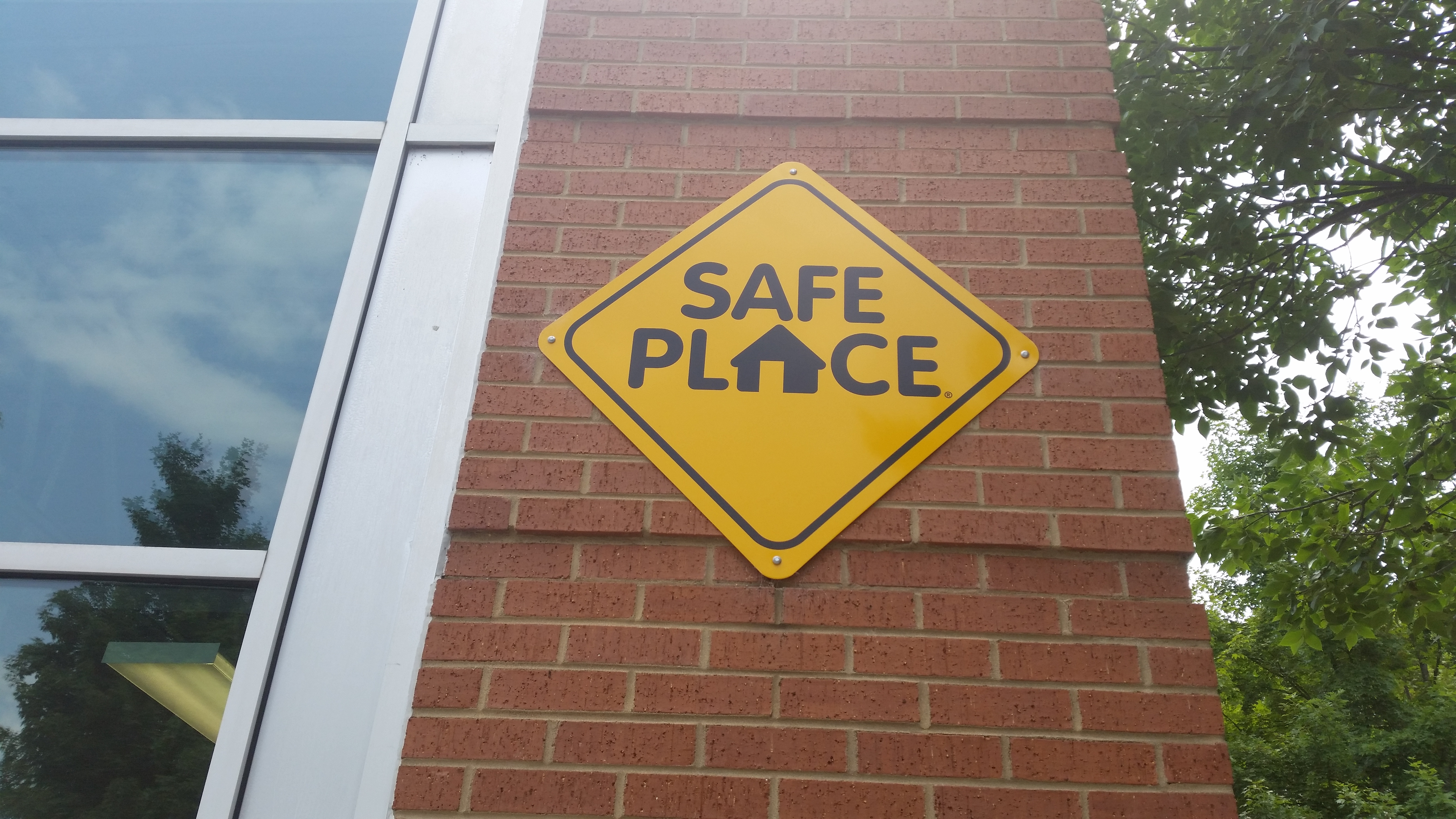
New logo, displayed outside a building in Knoxville, Tennessee, 2015.

National Safe Place (doing business as National Safe Place Network) is a non-profit organization based out of Louisville, Kentucky. It originated in 1983 from an initiative known as "Project Safe Place", established by a short-term residential and counseling center for youth 12 to 17.

The organization's Safe Place program is intended to provide access to immediate help and support for children and adolescents who are "at risk" or in crisis situations. That includes, for example, children who are runaways or those experiencing homelessness. The purpose is to both defuse a potential crisis situation as well as provide immediate counsel and support so the child in crisis may be directed to an appropriate shelter or accredited care facility. Various sites in select communities participate in the program, displaying its logo to signify the location as a Safe Place.

== History ==
Project Safe Place, a youth outreach program, began in 1983. It was launched by Shelter House, a YMCA in Louisville, Kentucky, serving the local community. The Safe Place program was created by Shelter House employee Larry Wooldridge. A fire station, located at 6th and Hill streets, served as the first Safe Place location, in partnership with Shelter House.

In 1986, U.S. president Ronald Reagan awarded Safe Place the Presidential Citation for Private Sector Initiatives. The program began expanding nationwide that year. In 1988, the name National Safe Place was established. The program launched in the New York metropolitan area that year, and was in more than 100 cities and counties by 1990. Providian became a financial contributor to the program in 1995, and was later bought out by Aegon, which took over as national sponsor.

In 1998, the United States Senate designated March 15-21 as National Safe Place Week, raising awareness of the program. This included national public service announcements featuring actresses Della Reese and Roma Downey.

In 2001, Safe Place locations existed in more than 30 states, serving 600 communities. It expanded to the Las Vegas Valley in 2002, and to Minnesota, its 41st state, in 2013. At that time, there were more than 20,000 Safe Place locations in the U.S. The program launched in Colorado Springs in 2017, and in the state of Idaho in 2021.

== Services ==
Various community businesses and organizations – including convenience stores, fire stations, schools, libraries, and public transit agencies – are designated as Safe Place sites. Any youth in crisis can walk into a Safe Place location and ask an employee for help. These locations display the yellow, diamond-shaped Safe Place sign. Inside, employees are trained and prepared to assist any young person asking for help. Youth who go to a Safe Place location are quickly connected to the nearby youth shelter. The shelter then provides the counseling and support necessary to reunify family members and develop a plan to address the issues presented by the youth and family. As of 2017, more than 358,000 youths had taken advantage of the program since it began 34 years earlier.

In October 2009, National Safe Place launched the TXT 4 HELP initiative, which provides youth immediate access to help and resources through text messaging. Youth can text the word "safe" and their current location to receive an immediate text response with the location and phone number of the closest Safe Place site or youth shelter. If a site or shelter is not within a 50-mile range, the youth receives the number to the National Runaway Safeline (1-800-RUNAWAY). In 2012, National Safe Place added the option for live, interactive texting with a trained mental health professional. With this addition, youth can immediately connect with Master's-level mental health professionals by text. In 2013, National Safe Place merged with the Youth & Family Services Network (YFSN) to create the National Safe Place Network. NSPN provides training and technical assistance to licensed Safe Place agencies and NSPN member organizations across the country. The National Safe Place Network also operates the Runaway and Homeless Youth Training and Technical Assistance Center (RHYTTAC), a national training resource for FYSB-funded Runaway and Homeless Youth grantees, as well as several other federally funded projects focused on human trafficking and other issues critical to youth service providers.

== See also ==
- Block Parent Program (Canada)
- Safety House Program (Australia)
