= National Night Out =

Community-police awareness-raising event in the United States

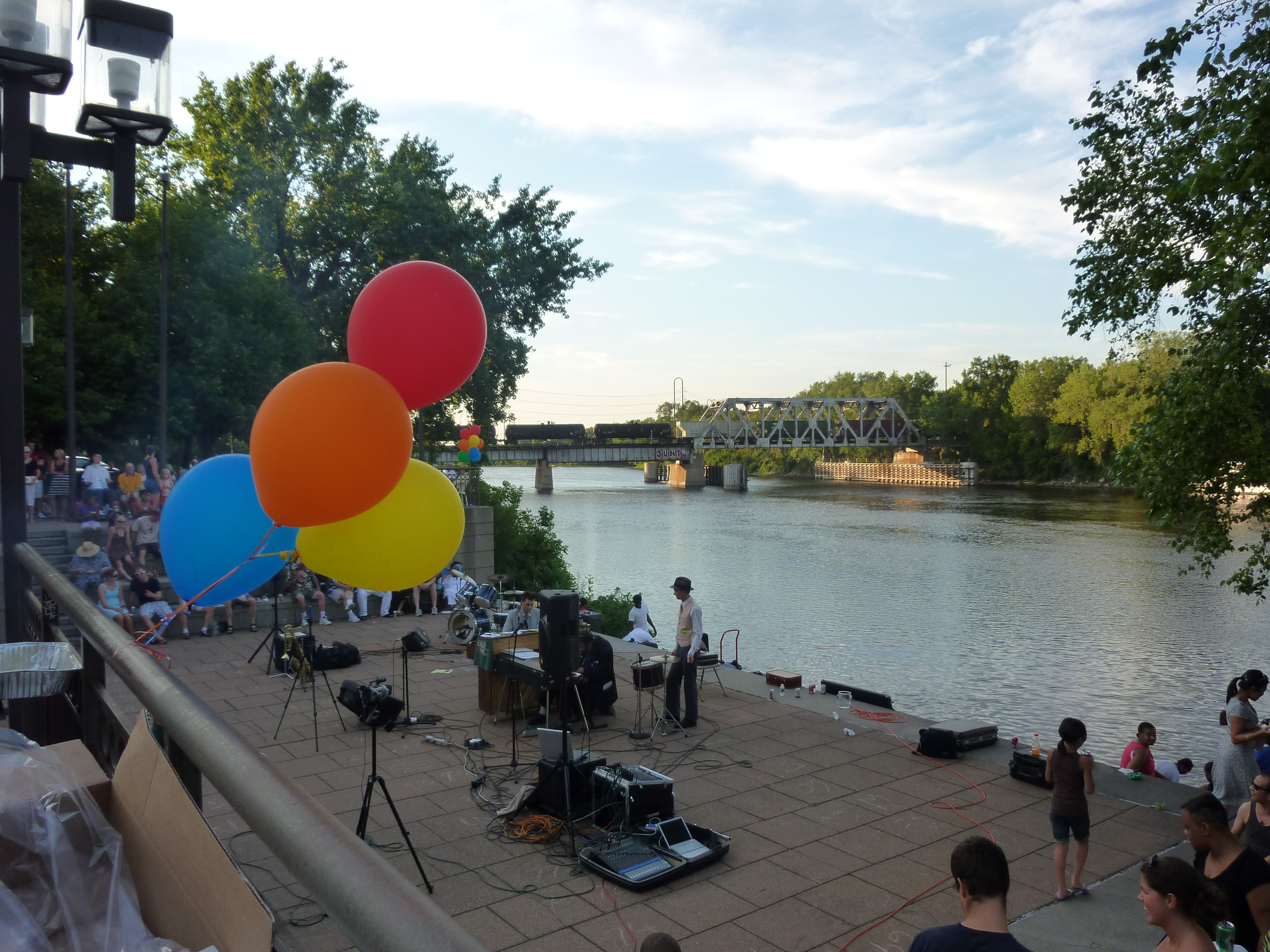
- A band plays on the Mississippi River during National Night Out in downtown Minneapolis in August 2010
- Type: National
- Significance: community-police awareness-raising
- Date: First Tuesday in August
- 2025 date: August 5
- 2026 date: August 4
- 2027 date: August 3
- 2028 date: August 1

National Night Out is a community policing awareness-raising event in the United States, officially held the first Tuesday of August in most regions, with select regions such as Texas holding the event on the first Tuesday of October, due to heat concerns.

== History ==
National Night Out was established by Matt Peskin in the western suburbs of Philadelphia, Pennsylvania, and has been held annually since 1984. In the United States, the event is sponsored by the National Association of Town Watch. National Night Out began simply with neighbors turning on their porch lights and sitting in front of their homes. The first National Night Out involved 2.5 million residents across 400 communities in 23 states; National Night Out 2016 involved 38 million residents in 16,000 communities across the United States.

== Activities ==
The event is meant to increase awareness about police programs in communities, such as drug prevention, town watch, neighborhood watch, and other anti-crime efforts.

The events are typically organized by block watches, nonprofit organizations, companies, and police departments. These events can be as simple as backyard cookouts or as complex as full-blown festivals like the one on the west side of Columbus, Ohio. The South Central Hilltop Block Watch in Columbus organizes one of the largest, which includes live music, food, and entertainment.

In Oxnard, California, neighborhoods such as Sycamore Senior Village have cookouts, live music, dancing, and visits by police officers, fire fighters, and paramedics with safety demonstrations, exhibits, and projects for all residents.
