= VALCRI =

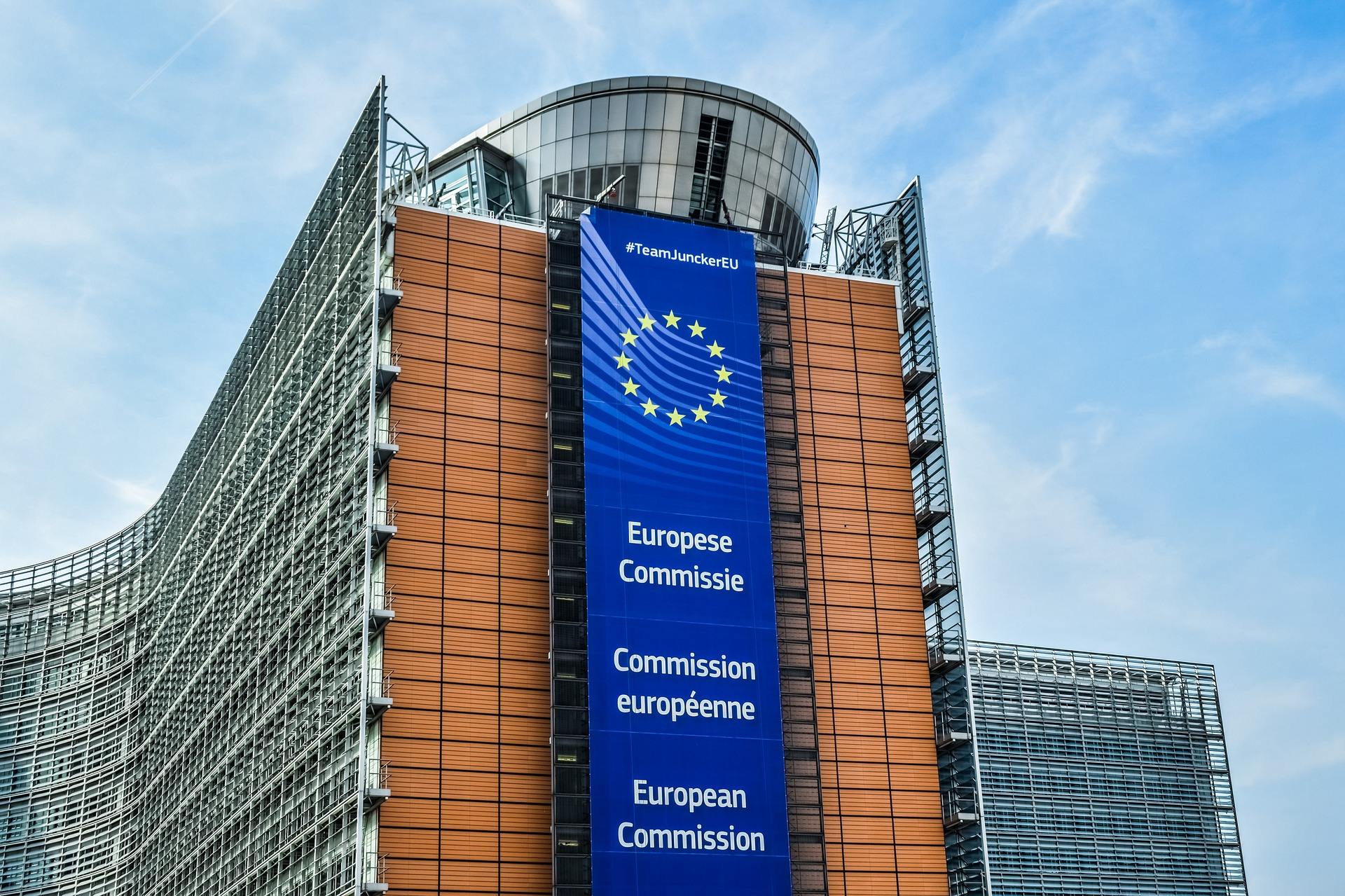
The project is funded by the European Commission

Visual Analytics for Sense-making in Criminal Intelligence Analysis (VALCRI) is a software tool that helps investigators to find related or relevant information in several criminal databases. The software uses big data processes to aggregate information from a wide array of different sources and formats and compiles it into visual and readable arrangements for users. It is used by various law enforcement agencies and aims to allow officials to utilize statistical information in their operations and strategy. The project is funded by the European Commission and is led by Professor William Wong at Middlesex University.

== Features ==
=== Automatic search ===
VALCRI can automatically search numerous databases using dedicated search engines. Previously, investigators would need to employ an average of 73 SQL queries and wait up to three days to find the right cases. The tool utilizes machine learning mechanisms to screen through masses of unstructured data to identify similarities between cases, and performs associative searching to comes up with reports based on the search criteria of users.

=== Data visualization ===
VALCRI can present data and information in visual formats such as maps, timelines, dispersion diagrams, and process charts. This creates an analyst dashboard that is designed to be integrated within the workforce and allow for investigative reasoning based on database information. The visualizations are interactive and encourage cooperative input from human analysis.

VALCRI also employs algorithms such as PCA, MDS, and t-SNE to embed data points into graphical representations. This feature allows for the statistical and mathematical calculation of similarity and correlation levels between different crime data sets through different algorithmic models which each have their own strengths and weaknesses.

== Concerns ==
=== Legal and ethical challenges ===
During the development of VALCRI, an Independent Ethics Board (IEB) and Security, Privacy, and Legal Group (SEPL) was created to monitor potential ethical challenges and roadblocks that the project would introduce. With the specialists in these boards, there were numerous concerns that were identified in respect to potential ethics and legality issues.

One issue that was identified by these boards was potential complications with human privacy. With the advent of a comprehensive database system that would be able to share billions of different data points for law enforcement, VALCRI faces potential roadblocks in navigating through different regional policies and laws regarding data privacy and security. This potential issue has been addressed in VALCRI by creating a dedicated group supervising data management policy in the software.

=== Cognitive and sense-making bias ===
VALCRI's data analysis capabilities offer criminal analysts a wider set of data points to base their conclusions on. Vienna University of Technology's research based on 120 case studies introduces the risk of cognitive and sense-making bias playing a significant role in influencing the conclusions that law enforcement agents draw, based on the visualizations provided by VALCRI. These risks can be mitigated in VALCRI by redesigning machine learning models and implementing de-biasing mechanisms such as Klein's data frame model so that it becomes easier to identify cognitive bias and adjust analysis objectives based on the findings.

== See also ==
- Palantir Technologies
- SAS (software)
- Clearview AI
- Computer vision
