= Citizen observer =

A citizen observer is a resident appointed by the chief of police, or by the deputy sheriff, who has met the specific application, background and training requirements for patrolling his or her neighborhood or city subdivision to observe and report suspicious persons and criminal activity. A citizen observer also seeks to mediate between law enforcement and civilians in an effort to establish unity between them. Occasionally, a citizen observer helps law enforcement in the patrolling of businesses as well. A citizen observer is a civilian working on behalf of law enforcement and does not have law enforcement titles, authority, or prerogatives.

An organization of citizen observers established by a community is called a citizen observer patrol (COP). In large cities where a citizen observer patrol is present, crime is often minimized considerably and fewer criminal acts go unreported to authorities. In addition, civilians in the community feel more secure, and better relations exist between law enforcement and them.

== See also ==
- Neighborhood watch
- Priority board
