= The Death and Life of Great American Cities =

1961 book by Jane Jacobs

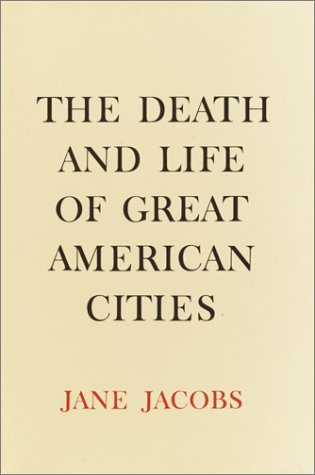
- Hardcover edition
- Author: Jane Jacobs
- Language: English
- Subject: Urban planning
- Publisher: Random House, New York City
- Publication date: 1961
- Publication place: United States
- Media type: Print
- Pages: 458 (1989 edition)
- ISBN: 0-679-74195-X
- OCLC: 500754
- Followed by: The Economy of Cities

The Death and Life of Great American Cities is a 1961 book by writer and activist Jane Jacobs. The book is a critique of 1950s urban planning policy, which it holds responsible for the decline of many city neighborhoods in the United States. The book is Jacobs' best-known and most influential work.

Jacobs was a critic of "rationalist" planners of the 1950s and 1960s, especially Robert Moses, as well as the earlier work of Le Corbusier. She argued that urban planning should prioritize the needs and experiences of residents, and modernist urban planning overlooked and oversimplified the complexity of human lives in diverse communities. She opposed large-scale urban renewal programs that affected entire neighborhoods and built freeways through inner cities. She instead advocated for dense mixed-use development and walkable streets, with the "eyes on the street" of passers-by helping to maintain public order. She suggested preserving the existing city fabric, including old buildings and established communities.

== Orthodox urbanism ==
Jacobs begins the work with a blunt statement: "This book is an attack on current city planning and rebuilding." She describes a trip to Boston's North End neighborhood in 1959, finding it friendly, safe, vibrant and healthy, and contrasting her experience against her conversations with elite planners and financiers in the area, who lament it as a "terrible slum" in need of renewal. Branding the mainstream theory of cities as an "elaborately learned superstition" that had now penetrated the thinking of planners, bureaucrats, and bankers in equal measure, she briefly traces the origins of this "orthodox urbanism."

=== Description ===
In summarizing the development of contemporary city planning theory, she begins with the Garden city movement of Ebenezer Howard. Garden City was conceived as a new master-planned form, a self-sufficient town removed from the noise and squalor of late 19th century London, ringed by agriculture green belts, with schools and housing surrounding a highly prescribed commercial center. The Garden City would allow a maximum of 30,000 residents in each town, and called for a permanent public authority to carefully regulate land use and ward off the temptation to increase commercial activity or population density. Industrial factories were allowed on the periphery, provided they were masked behind green spaces. The Garden City concept was first embodied in the UK by the development of Letchworth and Welwyn Garden City, and in the US suburb of Radburn, NJ.

Jacobs tracks Howard's influence through American luminaries Lewis Mumford, Clarence Stein, Henry Wright, and Catherine Bauer, a collection of thinkers that Bauer referred to as "Decentrists." The Decentrists proposed to use regional planning as a means to ameliorate the woes of congested cities, attracting residents to a new life in lower-density fringes and suburbs and thereby thinning out the crowded urban core. Jacobs highlights the anti-urban biases of the Garden City advocates and the Decentrists, especially their shared intuitions that communities should be self-contained units; that commingled land use created a chaotic, unpredictable, and negative environment; that the street was a bad locus for human interactions; that houses should be turned away from the street toward sheltered green spaces; that super-blocks fed by arterial roads were superior to small blocks with overlapping cross-roads; that any significant details should be dictated by permanent plan rather than shaped by organic dynamism; and that population density should be discouraged, or at least disguised to create a sense of isolation.

Jacobs continues her survey of orthodox urbanism with Le Corbusier, whose Radiant City concept envisioned twenty-four towering skyscrapers within a Great Park. Superficially at odds with the low-rise, low-density ideals of the Decentrists, Le Corbusier presented his vertical city, with its 1,200 inhabitants per acre, as a way of extending the primary Garden City concepts – the super-block, regimented neighborhood planning, easy automobile access, and the insertion of large grassy expanses to keep pedestrians off the streets – into the city itself, with the explicit goal of reinventing stagnant downtowns. Jacobs concludes her introduction with a reference to the City Beautiful movement, which dotted downtown areas with civic centers, baroque boulevards, and new monument parks. These efforts borrowed concepts from other contexts, such as single-use public space disconnected from natural walking routes and the imitation of the exposition grounds at the World's Fair in Chicago.

=== Sources ===
- Garden Cities of To-morrow, Ebenezer Howard.
- The Culture of Cities Lewis Mumford.
- Cities in Evolution, Sir Patrick Geddes.
- Modern Housing, Catherine Bauer.
- Toward New Towns for America, Clarence Stein.
- Nothing Gained by Overcrowding, Sir Raymond Unwin.
- The City of Tomorrow and Its Planning, Le Corbusier.

=== Jacobs' critique ===
Jacobs admits that the ideas of the Garden City and the Decentrists made sense on their own terms: a suburban town appealing to privacy-oriented, automobile-loving personalities should tout its green space and low-density housing. Jacobs' anti-orthodox frustration stems from the fact that their anti-urban biases somehow became an inextricable part of the mainstream academic and political consensus on how to design cities themselves, enshrined in course curricula and federal and state legislation affecting, inter alia, housing, mortgage financing, urban renewal, and zoning decisions. "This is the most amazing event in the whole sorry tale: that finally people who sincerely wanted to strengthen great cities should adopt recipes frankly devised for undermining their economies and killing them."

She is less sympathetic toward Le Corbusier, noting with dismay that the dream city, however impractical and detached from the actual context of existing cities, "was hailed deliriously by architects, and has gradually been embodied in scores of projects, ranging from low-income public housing to office building projects." She expresses further concern that, in seeking to avoid becoming contaminated by "the workaday city," isolated City Beautiful efforts dismally failed to attract visitors, were prone to unsavory loitering and dispirited decay, and ironically hastened the pace of urban demise.

== The significance of sidewalks ==
Jacobs frames the sidewalk as a central mechanism in maintaining the order of the city. "This order is all composed of movement and change, and although it is life, not art, we may fancifully call it the art form of the city and liken it to the dance." To Jacobs, the sidewalk is the quotidian stage for an "intricate ballet in which the individual dancers and ensembles all have distinctive parts which miraculously reinforce each other and compose an orderly whole."

Jacobs posits cities as fundamentally different from towns and suburbs principally because they are full of strangers. More precisely, the ratio of strangers to acquaintances is necessarily lopsided everywhere one goes in the city, even outside their doorstep, "because of the sheer number of people in small geographical compass." A central challenge of the city, therefore, is to make its inhabitants feel safe, secure, and socially integrated in the midst of an overwhelming volume of rotating strangers. The healthy sidewalk is a critical mechanism for achieving these ends, given its role in preventing crime and facilitating contact with others.

Jacobs emphasizes that city sidewalks should be considered in combination with physical environment surrounding sidewalks. As she put it, "A city sidewalk by itself is nothing. It is an abstraction. It means something only in conjunction with the buildings and other uses that border it, or border other sidewalks very near it."

=== Safety ===
Jacobs argues that city sidewalks and people who use sidewalks actively participate in fighting against disorder and preserving civilization. They are more than "passive beneficiaries of safety or helpless victims of danger". The healthy city sidewalk does not rely on constant police surveillance to keep it safe, but on an "intricate, almost unconscious, network of voluntary controls and standards among the people themselves, and enforced by the people themselves." Noting that a well-used street is apt to be relatively safe from crime, while a deserted street is apt to be unsafe, Jacobs suggests that a dense volume of human users deters most violent crimes, or at least ensures a critical mass of first responders to mitigate disorderly incidents. The more bustling a street, the more interesting it is for strangers to walk along or watch from inside, creating an ever larger pool of unwitting deputies who might spot early signs of trouble. In other words, healthy sidewalks transform the city's high volume of strangers from a liability to an asset.

The self-enforcing mechanism is especially strong when the streets are supervised by their "natural proprietors," individuals who enjoy watching street activity, feel naturally invested in its unspoken codes of conduct, and are confident that others will support their actions if necessary. They form the first line of defense for administering order on the sidewalk, supplemented by police authority when the situation demands it. She further concludes three necessary qualities that a city street needs to maintain safety: 1) a clear demarcation between public and private space; 2) eyes upon the street and sufficient buildings facing streets; 3) continuous eyes on the street to guarantee effective surveillance. Over time, a considerable number of criminological studies have applied the concept of "eyes on the street" in crime prevention.

Jacobs contrasts the natural proprietors to the "birds of passage", the transient and uninvested block dwellers who "have not the remotest idea of who takes care of their street, or how." Jacobs warns that, while neighborhoods can absorb a large number of these individuals, "if and when the neighborhood finally becomes them, they will gradually find the streets less secure, they will be vaguely mystified about it, and...they will drift away."

Jacobs draws a parallel between empty streets and the deserted corridors, elevators, and stairwells in high-rise public housing projects. These "blind-eyed" spaces, modeled after the upper-class standards for apartment living but lacking the amenities of access control, doormen, elevator men, engaged building management, or related supervisory functions, are ill-equipped to handle strangers, and therefore the presence of strangers becomes "an automatic menace." They are open to the public but shielded from public view, and thus "lack the checks and inhibitions exerted by eye-policed city streets," becoming flash points for destructive and malicious behavior. As residents feel progressively unsafe outside their apartments, they increasingly disengage from the life of the building and exhibit tendencies of birds of passage. These troubles are not irreversible. Jacobs claims that a Brooklyn project successfully reduced vandalism and theft by opening the corridors to public view, equipping them as play spaces and narrow porches, and even letting tenants use them as picnic grounds.

Building on the idea that a bustling pedestrian environment is a prerequisite for city safety in the absence of a contracted surveillance force, Jacobs recommends a substantial quantity of stores, bars, restaurants, and other public places "sprinkled along the sidewalks" as a means to this end. She argues that if city planners persist in ignoring sidewalk life, residents will resort to three coping mechanisms as the streets turn deserted and unsafe: 1) move out of the neighborhood, allowing the danger to persist for those too poor to move anywhere else, 2) retreat to the automobile, interacting with the city only as a motorist and never on foot, or 3) cultivate a sense of neighborhood "Turf", cordoning off upscale developments from unsavory surroundings using cyclone fences and patrolmen.

=== Contact ===
Sidewalk life permits a range of casual public interactions, from asking for directions and getting advice from the grocer, to nodding hello to passersby and admiring a new dog. "Most of it is ostensibly trivial but the sum is not trivial at all." The sum is "a web of public respect and trust," the essence of which is that it "implies no private commitments" and protects precious privacy. In other words, city dwellers know that they can engage in sidewalk life without fear of "entangling relationships" or oversharing the details of one's personal life. Jacobs contrasts this to areas with no sidewalk life, including low-density suburbia, where residents must either expose a more significant portion of their private lives to a small number of intimate contacts or else settle for a lack of contact altogether. In order to sustain the former, residents must become exceedingly deliberate in choosing their neighbors and their associations. Arrangements of this sort, Jacobs argues, can work well "for self-selected upper-middle-class people," but fails to work for anyone else.

Residents in places with no sidewalk life are conditioned to avoid basic interactions with strangers, especially those of a different income, race, or educational background, to the extent that they cannot imagine having a deep personal relationship with others so unlike themselves. This is a false choice on any bustling sidewalk, where everyone is afforded the same dignity, right of way, and incentive to interact without fear of compromising one's privacy or creating new personal obligations. In this way, suburban residents ironically tend to have less privacy in their social lives than their urban counterparts, in addition to a dramatically reduced volume of public acquaintances.

=== Assimilating children ===
Sidewalks are great places for children to play under the general supervision of parents and other natural proprietors of the street. More importantly, sidewalks are where children learn the "first fundamental of successful city life: People must take a modicum of public responsibility for each other even if they have no ties to each other." Over countless minor interactions, children absorb the fact that the sidewalk's natural proprietors are invested in their safety and well-being, even lacking ties of kinship, close friendship, or formal responsibility. This lesson cannot be institutionalized or replicated by hired help, as it is essentially an organic and informal responsibility.

Jacobs states that sidewalks of thirty to thirty-five feet in width are ideal, capable of accommodating any demands for general play, trees to shade the activity, pedestrian circulation, adult public life, and even loitering. However, she admits that such width is a luxury in the era of the automobile, and finds solace that twenty-foot sidewalks – precluding rope jumping but still capable of lively mixed use – can still be found. Even if it lacks proper width, a sidewalk can be a compelling place for children to congregate and develop if the location is convenient and the streets are interesting.

== The role of parks ==
Orthodox urbanism defines parks as "boons conferred on the deprived populations of cities." Jacobs challenges the reader to invert this relationship, and "consider city parks deprived places that need the boon of life and appreciation conferred on them." Parks become lively and successful for the same reason as sidewalks: "because of functional physical diversity among adjacent uses, and hence diversity among users and their schedules." Jacobs offers four tenets of good park design: intricacy (stimulating a variety of uses and repeat users), centering (a main crossroads, pausing point, or climax), access to sunlight, and enclosure (the presence of buildings and a diversity of surroundings).

The fundamental rule of the neighborhood sidewalk also applies to the neighborhood park: "liveliness and variety attract more liveliness; deadness and monotony repel life." Jacobs admits that a well-designed park in a focal point of a lively neighborhood can be an enormous asset. But with so many worthy urban investments going unfunded, Jacobs warns against "frittering away money on parks, playgrounds and project land uses too large, too frequent, too perfunctory, too ill-located, and hence too dull or too inconvenient to be used."

== City neighborhoods ==
Jacobs also criticizes orthodox urbanism for viewing the city neighborhood as a modular, insulated grouping of roughly 7,000 residents, the estimated number of persons to populate an elementary school and support a neighborhood market and community center. Jacobs instead argues that a feature of a great city is the mobility of residents and fluidity of use across diverse areas of varying size and character, not modular fragmentation. Jacobs' alternative is to define neighborhoods at three levels of geographic and political organization: city-level, district-level and street-level.

The city of New York as a whole is itself a neighborhood. The key local government institutions operate at the city-level, as do many social and cultural institutions – from opera societies to public unions. At the opposite end of the scale, individual streets – such as Hudson Street in Greenwich Village – can also be characterized as neighborhoods. Street-level city neighborhoods, as argued elsewhere in the book, should aspire to have a sufficient frequency of commerce, general liveliness, use and interest so as to sustain public street life.

Finally, the district of Greenwich Village is itself a neighborhood, with a shared functional identity and common fabric. The primary purpose of the district neighborhood is to intermediate between the needs of the street-level neighborhoods and the resource allocation and policy decisions made at the city-level. Jacobs estimates the maximum effective size of a city district to be 200,000 people and 1.5 square miles, but prefers a functional definition over a spatial definition: "big enough to fight city hall, but not so big that street neighborhoods are unable to draw district attention and to count." District boundaries are fluid and overlapping, but are sometimes defined by physical obstructions such as major roadways and landmarks.

Jacobs ultimately defines neighborhood quality as a function of how well it can govern and protect itself over time, employing a combination of residential cooperation, political clout, and financial vitality. Jacobs recommends four pillars of effective city neighborhood planning:

- To foster lively and interesting streets
- To make the fabric of the streets as continuous a network as possible throughout a district of potential subcity size and power.
- To use parks, squares, and public buildings as part of the street fabric, intensifying the fabric's complexity and multiple uses rather than segregating different uses
- To foster a functional identity at the district level

Jacobs is particularly critical of urban renewal programs that demolished entire neighborhoods such as the case in San Francisco's Fillmore district, creating a diaspora of its displaced poor residents. She claims these policies destroy communities and innovative economies by creating isolated, unnatural urban spaces. (see non place and hyperreality)

== Proposed alternatives ==
In their place Jacobs described "four generators of diversity" that "create effective economic pools of use":

- Mixed primary uses, activating streets at different times of the day
- Short blocks, allowing high pedestrian permeability
- Buildings of various ages and states of repair
- Density

Her aesthetic can be considered opposite to that of the modernists, upholding redundancy and vibrancy against order and efficiency. She frequently cites New York City's Greenwich Village as an example of a vibrant urban community. The Village, like many similar communities, may well have been preserved, at least in part, by her writing and activism.

== Reception and legacy ==
The book continues to be Jacobs' most influential, and was a finalist for the 1962 National Book Award for Nonfiction. It has been translated into six languages and has sold over a quarter-million copies. Urban theorist Lewis Mumford, while finding fault with her methodology, encouraged Jacobs' early writings in the New York Review of Books. Samuel R. Delany's book Times Square Red, Times Square Blue relies heavily on The Death and Life of Great American Cities in its analysis of the nature of social relations within the realm of urban studies.

The book played a major role in turning public opinion against modernist planners, notably Robert Moses. Robert Caro has cited Jacobs' book as a strong influence on The Power Broker, his biography of Robert Moses. It also contributed to slowing redevelopment in Toronto, Ontario, Canada, where Jacobs was involved in the campaign to stop the Spadina Expressway.

== Bibliography ==
- The Death and Life of Great American Cities (Modern Library (hardcover) ed.). New York: Random House. February 1993 [1961]. ISBN 0-679-60047-7. This edition includes a new foreword written by the author.
- Insights and Reflections on Jane Jacobs' Legacy. Toward a Jacobsian theory of the city
- Robert Kanigel (2016). Eyes on the Street: The Life of Jane Jacobs. New York: Alfred A. Knopf. ISBN 9780307961907.

== See also ==
- Crime prevention through environmental design (CPTED)
- Defensible space theory
- Urban vitality
