= Neighborhood watch =

Organized group of neighbours dedicated to crime prevention

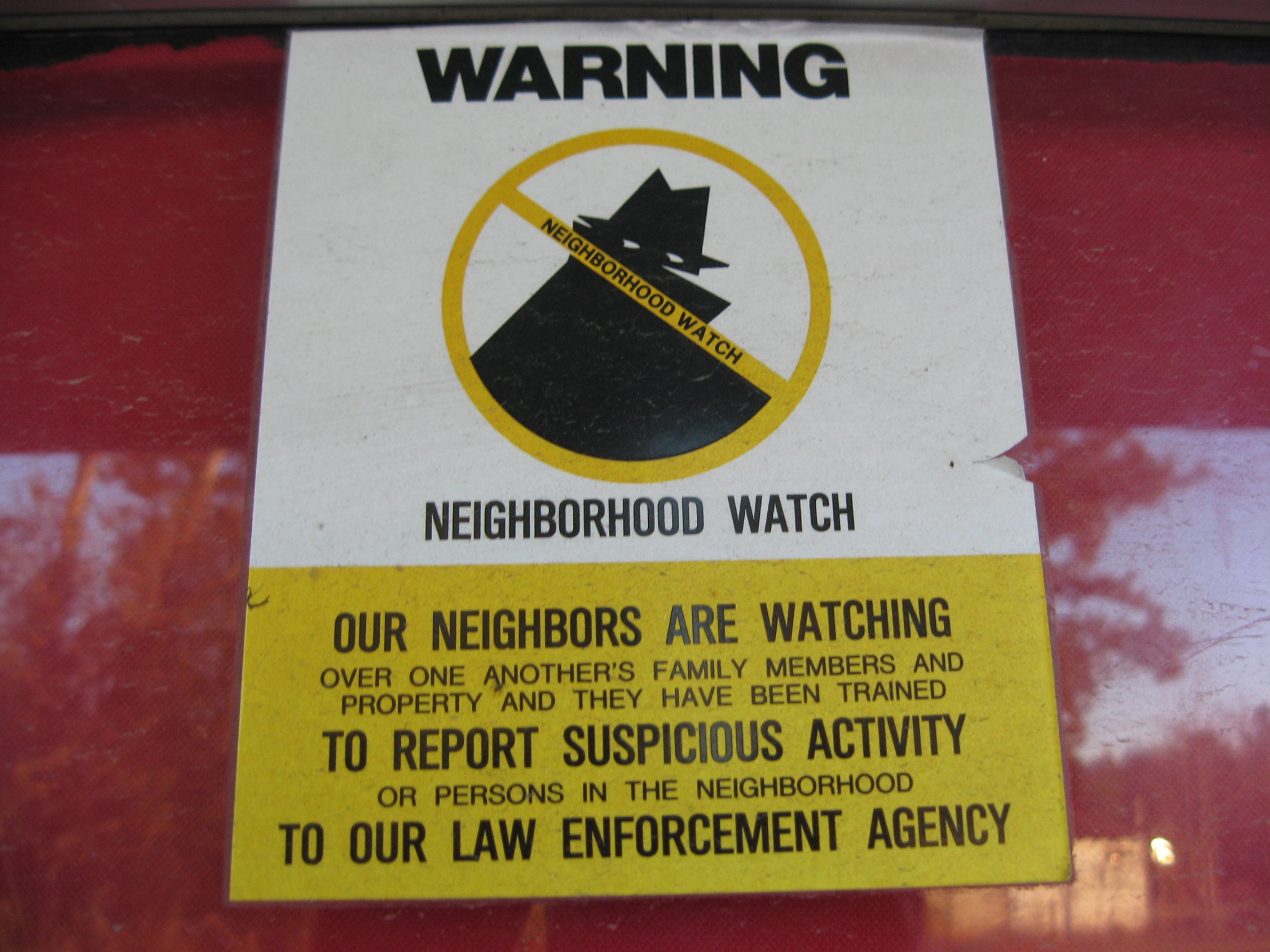
A neighborhood watch sign near Picayune, Mississippi, United States. Many U.S. signs feature "Boris the Burglar", a character trademarked by the National Sheriffs' Association.

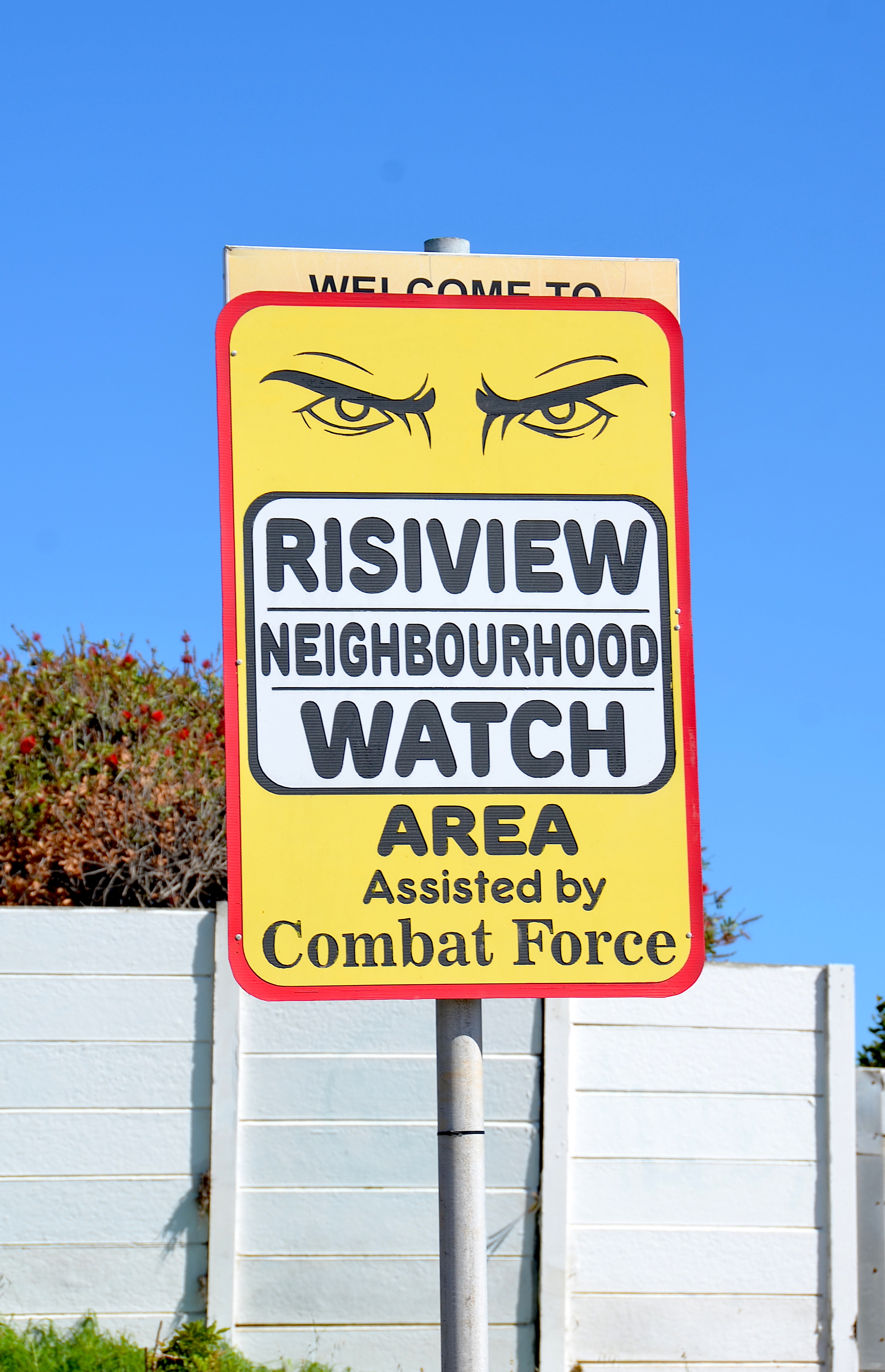
Neighbourhood Watch Sign, Combat Force Assistance (South Africa)

A neighborhood watch or neighbourhood watch (see spelling differences), also called a crime watch or neighbourhood crime watch, is an organized group of civilians devoted to crime and vandalism prevention within a neighborhood.

The aim of neighborhood watch includes educating residents of a community on security and safety and achieving safe and secure neighborhoods. However, when a criminal activity is suspected, members are encouraged to report to authorities, and not to intervene.

== Organization ==
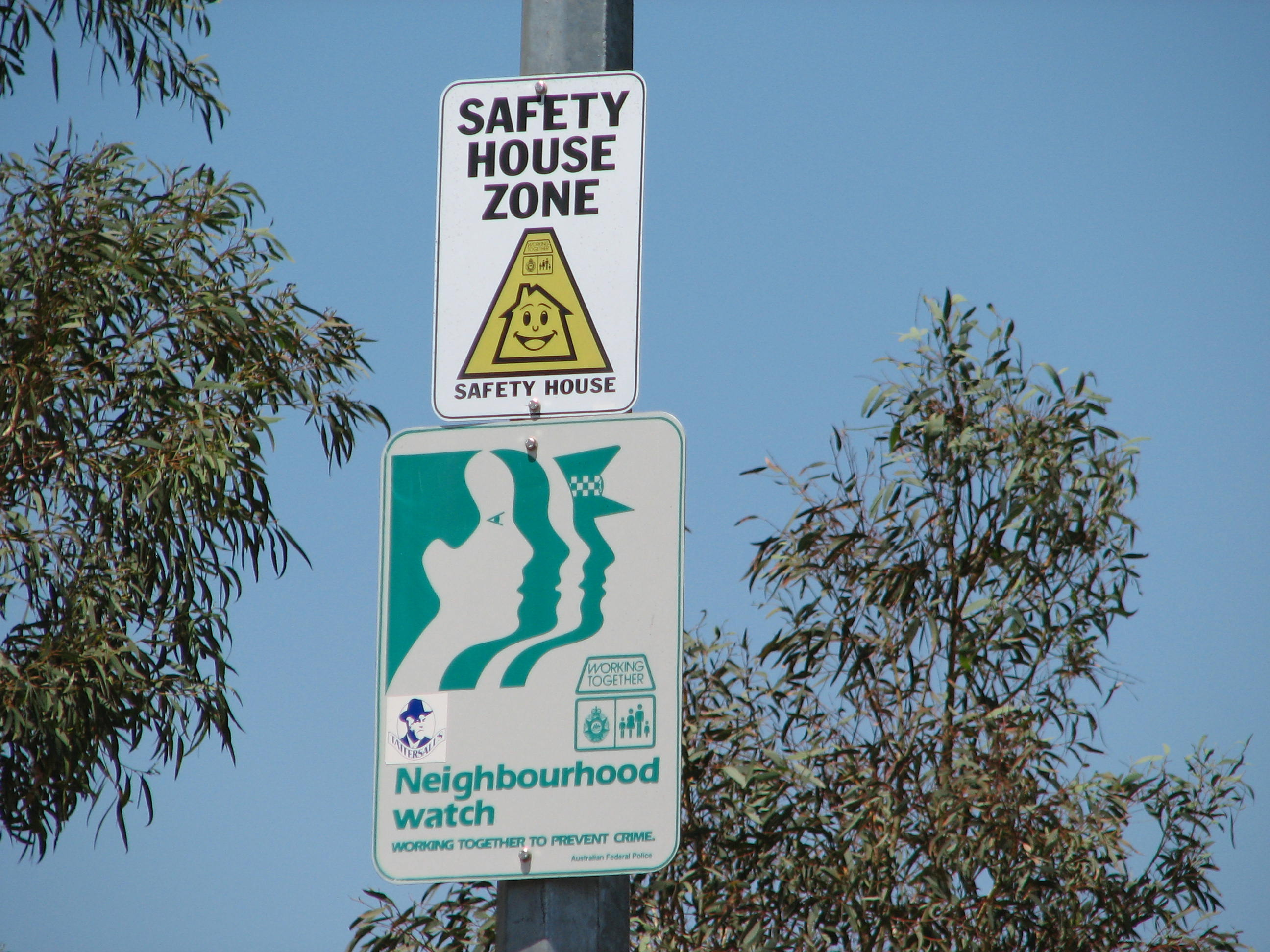
Sign denoting a Neighbourhood Watch area in Canberra, ACT, Australia.

A neighborhood watch may be organized as its own group or may simply be a function of a neighborhood association or other community association.

While not all neighborhood watch groups are vigilantes, some are and use vigilante practices in order for them to handle crime in their neighborhoods. In the United States, neighborhood watch groups increased in popularity throughout the 1980s and 1990s in part as a response to the perceived ineffectiveness of new policing strategies.

Other programs similar to Neighborhood Watch include Operation Identification, a citizen's burglary prevention program for use in homes and businesses that was developed in the United States during the 1960s.

== History ==
=== Australia ===
The Neighbourhood Watch Australasia (NHWA) program was first introduced in New South Wales in 1984. The logo with the four faces was designed by a Victorian volunteer community commission in 1983, where it has since become the nationally acknowledged brand of NHW. The first NHWA Journal was published in October 2006, where it contained information on crime prevention instructions and events from each of the NHWA regions. In 2007 NHWA was listed as an incorporated association. In 2010 NHWA featured its own online website and in 2011 it established its Facebook page.

In 2014, several Neighbourhood Watch groups in the Gold Coast faced a lack of interest from the community. Throughout the 2000s, Broadbeach had 22 groups that were surveilling the streets in Mermaid Waters. In 2014, however, only three people attended the committees due to disinterest.

Run by members of the community, the NSW Police supports and assists the NHW program. The program is not for profit and it is not funded by the NSW Police Force, or any other government organisations. It is rather assisted through fundraising, sponsorships and grants. Members of the community are encouraged to participate within the program and membership is free of charge. Participants act as a conduit between NSW Police and their local area by encouraging crime prevention and closer community relations. Diversity is reflected in the NHW program and is encouraged.

=== United States ===
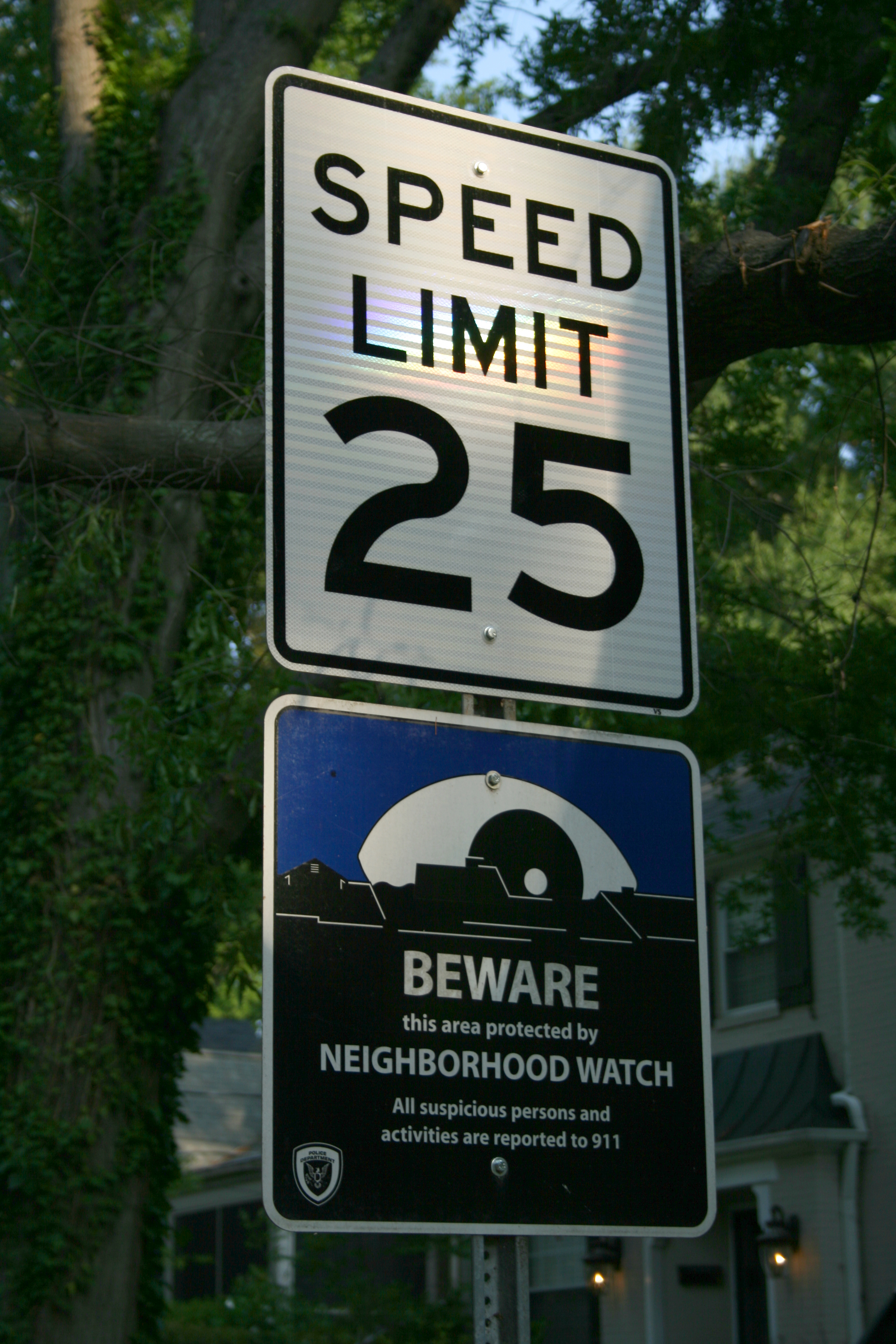
Speed limit and neighborhood watch signs in Durham, North Carolina, United States

A black, orange and white neighborhood watch sign on a residential street in Westchester, Los Angeles, California.

The current American system of neighborhood watches began developing in the late 1960s as a response to the rape and murder of Kitty Genovese in Queens, New York. People became outraged after false reports that a dozen witnesses did nothing to save Genovese or to apprehend her killer. Inspired in part by Jane Jacobs' The Death and Life of Great American Cities (1961), which stated that Americans need to keep their "eyes on the streets" and connect with each other in their neighborhoods, national law enforcement agencies began pushing for community members to get more involved with reporting crimes at the local level.

Some local civilians formed groups to watch over their neighborhoods and to look out for any suspicious activity in their areas. Shortly thereafter, the National Sheriffs' Association began a concerted effort in 1972 to revitalize the "watch group" effort nationwide. During the first few years of the program, neighborhood watch functioned primarily as an intermediary between local law enforcement agencies and neighborhoods, to pass along information about burglaries and thefts in specific neighborhoods. Soon thereafter, the neighborhood watch became more involved and partnered with law enforcement agencies to report other types of crime as well.

=== Kazakhstan ===
In August 2011, police and municipal authorities in Petropavl city, the administrative center of the North Kazakhstan province, introduced the concept of a "neighborhood watch". Having studied Estonia's neighborhood watch model, the police chief of North Kazakhstan set up a special office consisting of a 24-hour telephone hotline operated by civilians to respond to citizen complaints and anonymous tip offs. To support their work, the provincial authorities spent 15 million tenge that year to set up billboards and play television and radio ads encouraging citizens to report wrongdoing or anything suspicious to the police: "the safety of your home, your family and friends is in your hands". By the end of 2012, this hotline had received 3,245 calls and in 2013, 2,797 calls. The police chiefs viewed this as a success. In 2013, the North Kazakhstan province police chief was transferred to lead the police department of the Almaty province and he launched the neighborhood watch program there by linking it explicitly to zero tolerance policing.

Some attempts to introduce the neighborhood watch program have been made in the cities of Taraz (2016), Aqtau (2017) and Qyzylorda (2020) but they produced little success and have been largely ignored in other parts of the country.

=== Germany ===
- Bavaria has created a system of citizen patrols (in german: Sicherheitswacht) where unarmed teams of two volunteers patrol assigned areas to improve security. These teams have a radio to call for help if needed and a black and white armband with letters identifying them as a neighborhood watch patrol.
- The citizens in Baden-Württemberg can take part in the Police Volunteer Programme, where approximately 1,200 citizens volunteer to assist the local police in 20 cities. These volunteers are specially trained, wear uniforms and are armed. Their main task is crime prevention: they carry out foot patrols to deter street crime, near schools and kindergartens and maintain contact with potential victims of common crime and juvenile delinquency.
- The citizens in Hesse can also participate in a Police Volunteer Program, where some citizens have voluntarily helped the local police. The volunteers are trained for 50 hours, receive a blue uniform, pepper spray and a mobile phone. Their main task is crime prevention: conducting foot patrols to deter street crime, patrolling near schools and kindergartens and maintaining contact with potential victims of common crime and juvenile delinquency. People can also join the security police (in German: Wachpolizei) which have fewer powers and get paid less than the regular police to perform basic tasks such as traffic police or guard duties, freeing up the police officers from regular work.

== Controversies ==
=== United States ===
The neighborhood watch system gained media attention after the February 2012 fatal shooting of unarmed teenager Trayvon Martin in Sanford, Florida by George Zimmerman, an appointed neighborhood watch coordinator. Zimmerman claimed self-defense and was tried for second-degree murder and manslaughter, and acquitted from all charges. His actions on the night of the shooting generated controversy as he exited his vehicle and was carrying a firearm, both of which go against neighborhood watch recommendations. He has also been accused by prosecutors of racially profiling Martin, and he was investigated by the United States Department of Justice for possibly committing a racial hate crime. However, the FBI concluded their investigation and dropped its charges. Martin was black and Zimmerman is a mixed-race Hispanic.

In another incident involving a neighborhood watch, Eliyahu Werdesheim, part of an Orthodox Jewish community in Maryland, was convicted in May 2012 of second-degree assault and false imprisonment for beating and then pinning down a teenager he thought suspicious in 2010. Werdersheim and his brother, who had also been charged in the case but was acquitted, chose a bench trial, contending they would not get a fair trial due to the publicity over the Martin case. He was given a three-year suspended sentence and three years of probation at sentencing in June 2012. In December 2013, Werdesheim's probation was cut short, and he was released at the end of the month.

A June 2012 New York Times article reported neighborhood watches in the New York City area are growing again after, decades of decrease due to lower crime rates. It also said that neighborhood watch groups fell under scrutiny since the shooting of Trayvon Martin.

In response to the Trayvon Martin case, Congresswoman Sheila Jackson Lee (D-Texas) began drafting a bill which would require neighborhood watch groups to be certified and limit their duties. Neighborhood watch groups are usually overseen by local police, and can vary in training and rules. Robert McCrie, professor of security management at John Jay College of Criminal Justice in New York City, disagrees with Lee's initiative. He believes standards for neighborhood watches "are best left to the state or local community", although he would support background checks for volunteers.

More recently, some municipalities in the U.S. have seen increased public interest in the removal of neighborhood watch signage from their local streets, claiming the signs are ineffective at reducing crime and may perpetuate stereotypes. A city council member of Ann Arbor, Michigan remarked, "It really hearkens back to a time when public safety was more about surveillance and exclusion of people from communities and trying to look out for anyone who looked different".

== Notable neighborhood watch organizations ==
- Block Parent Program (Canada)
- Burgernet (the Netherlands)
- Chaoyang masses (China)
- Citizen Observer (US)
- Crimestoppers (US, UK and Australia)
- Grid-style social management (China)
- Guardian Angels (US)
- National Neighborhood Watch Program (US)
- National Night Out (US)
- Natteravnene (Norway)
- Neighbourhood Watch (United Kingdom)
- Inminban (North Korea)
- PubWatch (UK)
- Shopwatch (UK)
- Police Mitra (India)
- Senkom Mitra Polri (Indonesia)
- Shomrim (US and UK)
- Voluntary People's Druzhina (Soviet Union)
- Neighbourhood Watch & Community Service Corps (Nigeria)

== See also ==
- Auxiliary police
- Civil Guard (Israel)
- Committees for the Defense of the Revolution (Cuba)
- Voluntary People's Druzhina (Soviet Union, Russia)
- Neighbourhood action group
- Priority board
- Special police
- Guardian angels
- Posse comitatus
- Vigilantism
