= Block Parent Program =

Canadian crime safety and prevention program

- The distinctive red-and-white sign that appears in windows of Block Parent homes
- Type: Child safety organization based in Canada
- Legal status: Active
- Purpose: Advocate and public voice, educator and network
- Headquarters: Barrie, Ontario, Canada
- Official language: English, French
- Website: Block Parent Program of Canada

The Block Parent Program (French: Le Programme Parents-Secours) is a large, volunteer-based, child safety and crime prevention program operating across Canada. Participants in the program (Block Parents) place signs on their homes indicating that the house is a police-screened, safe home for community members in distress, particularly children. If someone is in need of help and sees a block parent sign, they know there is someone home who can help them and call the appropriate emergency service if necessary.

The program, which included 300,000 participants in its heyday, is in decline. RCMP detachments in British Columbia and Prince Edward Island have abandoned the program, as have local police in major centres including Toronto and Ottawa. Participation declined from 253,000 homes in 1995 to approximately 25,000 in 2013. Factors in the decline include fewer parents at home (as more join the outside workforce), a greater reliance on mobile telephones or other communication technologies as an alternative to seeking assistance from neighbours, and more onerous police background checks in the post-9/11 era.

== History ==
The program began in London, Ontario in 1968. Independent programs began appearing across Canada until 1983 when a national committee was formed and the national Block Parents Program of Canada was created in 1986. The first school affiliated with the Block Parent program was Arthur Stringer Public School on Shaftesbury Avenue in London, ON.

Block Parent programs happened in the United States as far back at the late 1960s. The three known locations were San Diego and San Jose, California and Boise, Idaho. The signs placed in windows at that time were orange or white square, approximately 12×12 inches, with a large black 'X'. Homeowners would place their signs on the window pane, leaning against their window, with the 'X' facing the street.

== Local and regional decline ==
Some provinces and communities are discontinuing or proposing to discontinue the Block Parent program, for various reasons. Occasionally, regional programs have been revived after shutting down.

- In March 2005 the British Columbia Block Parent Society asked volunteers to remove the signs from homes.
- In Prince Edward Island in November 2006, the Block Parent Program was discontinued because it was "unable to recruit a provincial executive".
- The program was discontinued in 2003 in the City of Toronto and in 2008 in the City of Ottawa.
- In the cities of Kitchener and Waterloo, the number of participating homes when the program began in the area was over 3,000. Participation suffered an enormous decline until recently; participation decreased by more than 50%. There were less than 1,500 homes involved in the program, and many positions such as event coordinator and treasurer were not filled. This decrease has been attributed to the police checks that are now required for program applicants and those already participating. These factors nearly caused the program in the region to shut down in February 2009 until a group of volunteers revived it.

== See also ==
- Neighborhood watch
- National Safe Place (US)
- Safety House Program (Australia)
