= National Sheriffs' Association =

U.S. trade association

- Founded: 1940
- Type: Trade Association
- Purpose: Professional development, congressional advocacy
- Location: Alexandria, Virginia, United States
- Region served: United States
- Method: Annual conferences, Sheriff & Deputy magazine, media attention, technical assistance, trainings and seminars
- Website: www.sheriffs.org

The National Sheriffs' Association (NSA) is a U.S. trade association. Its stated purpose is to raise the level of professionalism among U.S. sheriffs, their deputies and others in the fields of criminal justice and public safety. Since its founding in 1940, NSA has been the advocacy organization for the nation's sheriffs in Washington, D.C. Its Government Affairs Division, in conjunction with the Congressional Affairs Committee, develops the Association's policy positions and represents the Association before the United States Congress, the White House, and the various federal agencies.

== Purpose ==
The NSA provides resources, technical assistance, opportunities for professional development, information, congressional advocacy, to criminal justice practitioners. Its annual conferences provide networking opportunities, discussion, review and formation of the Association's national policy positions on critical criminal justice and homeland security issues, and training and seminars for the Nation's sheriffs and sheriff deputies. The NSA represents over 3,000 elected sheriffs nationwide and has a membership of over 22,000. Its headquarters is in Alexandria, Virginia.

== History ==
The Articles of Incorporation for NSA were filed on September 26, 1940, with the Ohio Secretary of State. The first president was Sheriff Walter P. O'Neil.

The National Sheriffs' Association badge has heraldic significance. According to their website, the shield denotes defense, protection, and faith. The fasces denotes authority. The olive wreath denotes peace. The circle surrounding the emblem denotes eternity. The five points of the star denote friendship, guidance, honesty, integrity, and merit.

In April 2024, the National Sheriffs' Association protested against the sale of Vista Outdoor to Czechoslovak Group.

== Key programs ==
- Neighborhood Watch is a program to have citizens work with law enforcement to deter crime.
- National Sheriffs' Institute (NSI) trains new sheriffs.

== Leadership ==
The 2019–20 President of the Association is Sheriff Daron Hall, of the Davidson County (TN) Sheriff's Office. The 2018–19 President of the Association was Sheriff John Layton of Indiana.

== See also ==
- Commission on Accreditation for Law Enforcement Agencies
