= Henry Spallone =

American politician and ex-mayor of Yonkers

38th Mayor of Yonkers
- In office January 1, 1990 – December 31, 1991
- Preceded by: Nick Wasicsko
- Succeeded by: Terence M. Zaleski

Member of the Yonkers City Council

Personal details
- Born: Henry G. Spallone c. 1926 the Bronx, New York City, U.S.
- Died: November 27, 2009 Port St. Lucie, Florida, U.S.
- Party: Republican
- Spouse: Norma Spallone
- Occupation: Police detective, politician

Military service
- Allegiance: United States
- Branch/service: United States Army
- Battles/wars: World War II

Henry G. Spallone (c. 1926 – November 27, 2009), known as Hank Spallone, was an American politician and police detective who served as mayor of Yonkers, New York, from 1990 to 1991. A Republican, he came to national attention in the late 1980s as the most prominent opponent on the Yonkers City Council of a federal court order requiring the city to build public housing in its predominantly white neighborhoods.

Spallone was one of four council members held in contempt of court in 1988 for refusing to vote for the housing ordinance the city had agreed to adopt. He challenged the personal fines imposed on him, and in Spallone v. United States (1990) the Supreme Court of the United States ruled 5–4 that the trial judge had abused his discretion by sanctioning individual legislators before testing whether sanctions against the city alone would secure compliance. He was elected mayor in November 1989, defeating the incumbent Nick Wasicsko, and served a single two-year term.

== Early life and career ==
Spallone was born in the Bronx. He served in the United States Army during World War II, stationed in Germany, and afterwards joined the New York City Police Department, retiring as a detective. He later settled in Yonkers and entered local politics, winning election to the Yonkers City Council.

== Housing desegregation dispute ==
In 1985, in a suit brought by the United States and the NAACP, the federal district court found that Yonkers and its community development agency had for decades intentionally concentrated subsidized housing in the city's south-west, where most of its minority residents lived, in violation of the Fair Housing Act and the Equal Protection Clause. In January 1988 the city entered into a consent decree that committed it to adopt legislation providing for public housing in other parts of Yonkers.

When the council declined to pass the required ordinance, Judge Leonard B. Sand held both the city and four individual council members, Spallone among them, in contempt in August 1988. Fines against the city were set to double each day, and the council members were fined $500 a day. Spallone and the other three refused to change their votes. With the city's daily penalty approaching $1 million, the council adopted the affordable housing ordinance on September 9, 1988 by a vote of 5 to 2; Spallone voted against it.

=== Spallone v. United States ===
Spallone and two of the other sanctioned council members petitioned the Supreme Court, arguing that fining them personally for their votes was improper. The case was argued on October 2, 1989 and decided on January 10, 1990. Writing for a five-justice majority, Chief Justice William Rehnquist held that the district court had abused its discretion: it should first have imposed sanctions on the city alone, and only if that failed considered penalties against individual legislators, given the risk that personal fines would distort a legislator's duty to vote according to conscience. Justice William J. Brennan Jr. dissented, joined by three colleagues, arguing that the council members had used their offices to defy a court order the city had itself agreed to obey.

== Mayor of Yonkers ==
Spallone was elected mayor of Yonkers in November 1989, unseating Wasicsko, who had supported compliance with the court order. He took office on January 1, 1990 and served one two-year term. He did not win a further term, and was succeeded on January 1, 1992 by Terence M. Zaleski.

== Later life and death ==
Spallone later moved to Port St. Lucie, Florida. He died there at his home on November 27, 2009, at the age of 83. He was survived by his wife of 48 years, Norma, a stepson, Kenneth Schechter, and a sister, Virginia Sardi.

== In popular culture ==
Spallone was portrayed by Alfred Molina in Show Me a Hero, the 2015 HBO miniseries about the Yonkers housing dispute, created by David Simon and William F. Zorzi and directed by Paul Haggis.

Political offices
Preceded by Nick Wasicsko	Mayor of Yonkers; 1990–1991	Succeeded by Terence M. Zaleski
