= John Spencer (mayor) =

Former Mayor of Yonkers, New York

40th Mayor of Yonkers
- In office January 1, 1996 – January 1, 2004
- Preceded by: Terence M. Zaleski
- Succeeded by: Philip A. Amicone

Member of the Yonkers City Council from the 3rd district
- In office January 1, 1990 – January 1, 1996
- Preceded by: Charles A. Cola
- Succeeded by: Richard J. Martinelli

Personal details
- Born: November 17, 1946 (age 79) White Plains, New York, U.S.
- Party: Republican
- Spouses: Eileen Looney (m. 1971; div. 2003) Kathy Spring (m. 2003)
- Children: 5

Military service
- Allegiance: United States of America
- Branch/service: United States Army
- Years of service: 1966–1969
- Rank: First lieutenant
- Awards: Bronze Star; Combat Infantryman Badge

John Spencer (born November 17, 1946) is an American politician and former mayor of Yonkers, New York (1996–2004). He was the 2006 Republican nominee for U.S. Senator from New York and lost to the former first lady and 2016 Democratic presidential nominee Hillary Clinton.

== Early life, military service and education ==
Spencer was born in Yonkers, New York, the son of Edward and Ann McGlinchy Spencer. He was adopted and raised by Patrick and Nora Ginnane, who had eight children of their own. His adoptive mother died when he was eight, his adoptive father six years later. His sister Noreen Ginnane raised him.

He attended high school at Sacred Heart High School and after two years at Westchester Community College, he dropped out to join the United States Army during the Vietnam War. He earned an officer's commission as an infantry lieutenant and served a tour in Vietnam during 1968 through 1969. He holds the Combat Infantryman Badge and the Bronze Star.

== Early career ==
Spencer married Eileen Looney in 1971, and the couple went on to have two children.

Spencer worked in construction, real estate property management with Cushman & Wakefield, and as vice president of real estate management with Bankers Trust Co.

He then entered politics as a member of the Yonkers City Council in 1991. He served 6 years on City Council, with 4 years as Republican majority leader.

Spencer also was the founder of Spencer Consulting Group, where he uses his personal experience of overcoming alcoholism to help others defeat their addictions.

== Mayor of Yonkers ==
In 1996, John Spencer was sworn in as mayor of Yonkers. The city's finances had been under the oversight of a State Emergency Financial Control Board for more than a decade. Mayor Spencer insisted that the city had met its obligations and called for the removal of the New York State Control Board.

In 1998, control of the city's finances was returned to the city. The city was under a Federal Desegregation Order from a landmark decision of the federal Courts (Judge Sand, c. 1984), and Mayor Spencer had said that it was time to end Federal Control of Housing and Education in the city. Judge Sand agreed and after negotiations gave control back to the city on both issues, thus ending the Federal role in Yonkers. Mayor Spencer presided over development in Yonkers. Retail and housing were built on the downtown waterfront, a new library was completed, along with the Austin Avenue development of Costco, Home Depot, and Stew Leonard's. As part of the New State Control Board leaving, Mayor Spencer also went on to cut the Income Tax Surcharge by 2/3 and cut the Real Estate transfer tax from 3% to 1%, thus forcing the city to raise property taxes to make up the difference.

His mayoral chief of staff Kathy Spring bore him two children and later had a third in 2005. Spring's annual salary started at $52,000, and increased to $138,000 by the time Spencer left office.

In November 2003, Spencer could not run for re-election as mayor due to the term limits law that he himself championed and then tried to rescind. Mayor Spencer's deputy mayor Phil Amicone sought the office of Mayor with the support of Spencer, and successfully defeated Assemblyman Michael Spano in a Republican primary, and then went on to defeat Democratic candidate Joe Farmer in the general election.

== 2006 New York Senate race ==
In 2005, Spencer announced his candidacy for the Republican nomination for the U.S. Senate seat held by Democrat Hillary Clinton, who was seeking re-election to a second term. Politically, Spencer is opposed to abortion and gun control, and a supporter of tighter border security. His support for the Bush administration and its policies is well known, including but not limited to the war in Iraq.

On August 18, 2005, Spencer gave a radio interview where he said Westchester County, New York District Attorney Jeanine Pirro, another candidate for the Republican nomination, didn't have a "Chinaman's chance" of getting the Conservative line. Spencer was asked to apologize for the comment after an outcry from the Asian community that the statement was derogatory. Pirro dropped out of the race in December 2005.

On May 31, 2006, Spencer won the endorsement of the state Republican Party organization but did not achieve the threshold of 75 percent he needed to exclude his rival, former Pentagon aide Kathleen Troia "K.T." McFarland, from the primary ballot. He received 63 percent, and thus faced McFarland in the September 12, 2006 Republican primary, which he won by a margin of almost two to one. Spencer called on McFarland to step aside after the vote, but McFarland told CQPolitics.com she had no intention of withdrawing from the race.

In a June 2006 radio ad, Spencer expressed his disappointment in the national Republicans for not helping his Senate campaign.

In his 2006 election campaign, Spencer came out in favor of a New York Court of Appeals decision rejecting the claim of 42 gay and lesbian couples that same-sex marriage as constitutional right. On Kevin McCullough's talk radio program, Spencer said marriage is "between a man and a woman" and that a constitutional amendment is needed to enshrine that.

Clinton spent $36 million for her re-election, more than any other candidate for Senate in the 2006 elections. Polls during the general election campaign generally showed Clinton with a 20-point lead or better over Spencer. On November 7, 2006, Clinton won easily, garnering 67% of the vote to Spencer's 31%.

In 2006, former mayor Spencer was sued in civil court by a former City of Yonkers employee, Joan Gronowski, who later served as a city council member, who stated that she was told not to engage in political campaign activities while working for the city. Following a jury verdict, a $75,000 judgement against the city was narrowly affirmed in a 3–2 split decision.

Political offices
Preceded by Terence M. Zaleski	Mayor of Yonkers; 1996–2003	Succeeded by Phil Amicone
Party political offices
Preceded by Rick Lazio	Republican Nominee for U.S. Senate from New York (Class 1); 2006	Succeeded by Joseph DioGuardi
