= The Wild Pair =

The Wild Pair may refer to:

- The Wild Pair (film), a 1987 American film
- The Wild Pair (duo), a singing duo
