= 2006 United States Senate election in New York =

- November 7, 2006
- Turnout: 38.48%

Nominee	Hillary Clinton	John Spencer
Party	Democratic	Republican
Alliance	Parties: Independence; Working Families	Conservative
Popular vote	3,008,428	1,392,189
Percentage	67.00%	31.01%
- County results Clinton: 50–60% 60–70% 70–80% 80–90% Spencer: 40–50% 50–60%
U.S. senator before election
Hillary Clinton
Democratic
Elected U.S. Senator
Hillary Clinton
Democratic

The 2006 United States Senate election in New York was held on November 7, 2006. Incumbent Democratic U.S. Senator Hillary Clinton won re-election to a second term in office, by a more than two-to-one margin. Clinton was challenged by Republican John Spencer, the former mayor of Yonkers. Longtime political activist Howie Hawkins of the Green Party also ran a third-party campaign.

The election was not close, with Clinton winning 58 of New York's 62 counties. Clinton had a surprisingly strong performance in upstate New York, which was considered to be a tossup. Clinton's large margins in both upstate New York and in New York City helped propel her to a landslide victory over Spencer. Clinton was sworn in for what would be her last term in the Senate serving from January 3, 2007, to January 21, 2009, when she assumed the office of United States Secretary of State in the Obama administration.

== Democratic nomination ==
=== Candidates ===
- Hillary Clinton, incumbent Senator
- Jonathan B. Tasini, journalist and anti-war activist

==== Withdrew ====
- Mark Greenstein, businessman (endorsed Tasini)

=== Campaign ===
Hillary Clinton announced in November 2004 that she would seek a second term in the Senate, and began fundraising and campaigning. Clinton faced opposition for the Democratic party nomination from the anti-war base of her own party, that had become increasingly frustrated with her support for the Iraq War.

On October 12, 2005 New Paltz firefighter and activist Steven Greenfield, a former Green Party leader, announced he would run as a Democrat. On December 6, 2005, labor advocate Jonathan Tasini announced that he would run as well, running as an antiwar candidate, calling for immediate withdrawal of troops from Iraq, universal health care, expansion in Medicare benefits, the creation of Universal Voluntary Accounts for pensions, and what he termed "New Rules For the Economy", a more labor-centric as opposed to the corporate-centric approach to economic matters espoused by Clinton. Tasini was president of Economic Future Group and former president of the National Writers Union. Tasini was supported by anti-war activist Cindy Sheehan, who had in October said of Clinton, "I will resist her candidacy with every bit of my power and strength...I will not make the mistake of supporting another pro-war Democrat for president again."

On March 31, 2006, businessman Mark Greenstein announced his run for the seat. Greenstein, endorsed by the New Democrats, presented himself as a non-liberal Democrat who was campaigning to "bring the far left back to reality that Big Government is the source of most ongoing problems Democrat constituents face." He contended that Clinton was "too liberal" in her support for regulations, "too wishy-washy" on the Iraq war and on gay rights, and had lost integrity by using the Dubai Ports issue for political purposes. Greenstein challenged Clinton to sign a pledge that she would serve out her full 6 year Senate term if re-elected. However, in May 2006, Greenstein endorsed Tasini and essentially dropped out of the race.

On June 1, 2006, Clinton accepted the unanimous endorsement of the New York State Democratic Party's convention in Buffalo. Eight days later, Greenstein dropped out of the race. Tasini pressed on, submitting 40,000 signatures to the State Election Commission on July 14, far more than the 15,000 needed to force a primary. Clinton's campaign said that she would not challenge the signatures.

=== Results ===
Results by county: Clinton: 50–60%; 60–70%; 70–80%; 80–90%

Democratic primary
Party	Candidate	Votes	%
Democratic	Hillary Clinton (incumbent)	640,955	83.68%
Democratic	Jonathan B. Tasini	124,999	16.32%
Total votes		765,954	100.00%

== Republican nomination ==
=== Candidates ===
- K. T. McFarland, former Deputy Assistant United States Secretary of Defense
- John Spencer, former mayor of Yonkers

==== Withdrew ====
- Edward F. Cox, attorney and son-in-law of Richard Nixon
- Jeanine Pirro, Westchester County District Attorney (December 21, 2005) (ran for Attorney General)

=== Campaign ===
New York Republicans originally had high hopes of mounting a serious challenge to Clinton, and derailing her expected future presidential bid. However, Clinton was politically strong in the state and no major Republican entered the race, with Governor George Pataki and early 2000 senate opponent Rudy Giuliani both declining to run. The two most prominent Republicans contemplating a challenge to Clinton were lawyer Ed Cox (the son-in-law of former President Richard M. Nixon) and Westchester County District Attorney Jeanine Pirro.

Pirro was considered the front-runner, but her campaign had immediate difficulties. During her August 10, 2005 live televised candidacy announcement in New York City, she paused for more than thirty seconds looking for a missing part of her speech, then asked, on the air, "Do I have page 10?" Democrats re-aired the sequence as part of a Jeopardy! theme parody. The Conservative Party of New York was also reluctant to embrace Pirro. On August 18, 2005, another Republican candidate, former mayor of Yonkers John Spencer, gave a radio interview in which he attacked Pirro, calling her chances of winning the Conservative Party of New York State nomination "a Chinaman's chance." Spencer later apologized.

On October 14, 2005, Governor Pataki endorsed Pirro. Later that day, Cox withdrew from the race; his campaign had raised only $114,249 in contributions in the prior three months. On October 18, 2005, remarks by Pirro that appeared to suggest that Democrats were indifferent to child molesters and murderers drew sharp criticism from the Clinton campaign and others.

Pirro trailed Clinton badly in fund-raising and in polls; her campaign had failed to gain traction. Under pressure from state party officials, she dropped out of the race on December 21, 2005, to run for New York State Attorney General instead, leaving the Republicans without a well-known candidate. The announcement was timed to coincide with the 2005 New York City transit strike, so as to draw minimal attention to the Republicans' difficulties. Pirro did not mention her campaign woes, but instead said, "I have concluded that my head and my heart remain in law enforcement, and that my public service should continue to be in that arena."

Declared Republican candidates now included Spencer and K. T. McFarland, who was a Deputy Assistant Secretary of Defense for Public Affairs under President Ronald Reagan. Cox considered reentering the race but did not. Politically, Spencer was generally opposed to abortion, against gun control, and a supporter of tighter border security. He supported the George W. Bush administration and its policies, including the war in Iraq. Spencer came out in favor of New York's Court of Appeals denying same-sex marriage to 42 gay and lesbian couples who challenged that denial as unconstitutional. Spencer said that marriage equality for same-sex couples equated to "special rights for gays." Spencer was endorsed by Republican officials such as Congressman Vito Fossella. In contrast, McFarland was pro-choice. However, McFarland ran into trouble with a March comment that appeared to allege that the Clinton campaign had been flying helicopters low over her Southampton, New York house and spying on her; she later said she had been joking, but the episode upset her. In May, McFarland's campaign manager Ed Rollins made personal life charges against Spencer, to which the latter responded, "Shame on you."

On May 31, 2006, Spencer won the endorsement of the state Republican Party organization but did not achieve the threshold of 75 percent he needed to prevent McFarland from gaining an automatic position on the primary ballot. He received 63 percent and would thus have to face McFarland in the September 12 Republican primary. Spencer called on McFarland to step aside after the vote, but McFarland said she would not. In a June 2006 radio ad, Spencer attacked national Republicans for not funding his campaign. On August 22, McFarland announced that she would be suspending her campaign until further notice after her daughter was caught shoplifting.

=== Results ===
On September 12, 2006, Spencer defeated McFarland in the Republican Primary, winning 61 to 39 percent of the vote. Republican turnout was less than 6%, the lowest level in more than 30 years. Spencer would also gain the Conservative Party line.

=== Results ===
New York Republican Senate primary results 2006
Party	Candidate	Votes	%
Republican	John Spencer	114,914	60.79%
Republican	K.T. McFarland	74,108	39.21%
Total votes		189,022	100.00%

== General election ==
=== Candidates ===
- Hillary Rodham Clinton, incumbent U.S. Senator (Democratic, Working Families, and Independence)
- John Spencer, former mayor of Yonkers (Republican, Conservative)
- Bill Van Auken, writer and nominee for president in 2004 (Socialist Equality)
- Roger Calero, writer and nominee for president in 2004 (Socialist Workers)
- Howie Hawkins, anti-nuclear energy activist and founder of the Green Party (Green)
- Jeff Russell (Libertarian)

Lester "Beetlejuice" Green, a frequent guest on The Howard Stern Show announced a mock campaign via video for the "2008 New York Senate Election," though there was no Senate election in New York in 2008. His announcement video listed his stances on abortion and tax cuts. Green was not listed on any ballot.

=== Campaign ===
Clinton spent $36 million for her re-election, more than any other candidate for Senate in the 2006 elections. Polls during the campaign generally showed Clinton with a 20-point lead or better over Spencer, with none of the third-party candidates — Hawkins, Bill Van Auken of the Socialist Equality Party, and Jeff Russell of the Libertarian Party — showing strength.

During the campaign, Spencer also disparaged Clinton's looks, saying "You ever see a picture of her back then? Whew." and "I don't know why Bill married her." The Daily News also reported that Spencer said Clinton had undergone "millions of dollars of work -- plastic surgery" to help improve her appearance. "She looks good now," Smith quoted Spencer as saying.

Howard Wolfson, a Clinton political adviser, said the story showed that Spencer "is unfit for the U.S. Senate." "I'm not sure what's worse: that Mr. Spencer made these insulting comments or that, instead of owning up and apologizing for them, he is lying about them," Wolfson said in a written statement to CNN. "Either way, it's clear that he is unfit for the U.S. Senate." Wolfson also denied that the senator has ever had plastic surgery.

On November 7, 2006, Clinton won in a landslide, garnering 67% of the vote to Spencer's 31%.

=== Debate ===
2006 United States Senate election in New York debates
No.	Date	Host	Moderator	Link	Democratic	Republican
Key: P Participant A Absent N Not invited I Invited W Withdrawn						
Key: P Participant A Absent N Not invited I Invited W Withdrawn					Hillary Clinton	John Spencer
1	Oct. 20, 2006	NY1	Dominic Carter	C-SPAN	P	P
1	Oct. 22, 2006	WABC-TV	Bill Ritter	C-SPAN	P	P

=== Predictions ===
Source	Ranking	As of
The Cook Political Report	Solid D	November 6, 2006
Sabato's Crystal Ball	Safe D	November 6, 2006
Rothenberg Political Report	Safe D	November 6, 2006
Real Clear Politics	Safe D	November 6, 2006

=== Polling ===
Source	Date	Clinton (D)	Spencer (R)
Marist College	September 30, 2005	62%	31%
Strategic Vision (R)	October 27, 2005	66%	19%
Strategic Vision (R)	December 8, 2005	67%	20%
Quinnipiac	January 20, 2006	60%	30%
Siena Research Institute	January 30, 2006	58%	31%
Marist College	January 30, 2006	62%	33%
Strategic Vision (R)	March 2, 2006	63%	24%
Quinnipiac	March 30, 2006	60%	30%
Zogby International	April 4, 2006	54%	33%
Strategic Vision (R)	April 28, 2006	58%	24%
Siena Research Institute	May 4, 2006	58%	33%
Marist College	May 10, 2006	63%	33%
Quinnipiac	May 18, 2006	63%	27%
Field Research Corporation	June 5, 2006	59%	28%
Siena Research Institute	June 19, 2006	58%	32%
Quinnipiac	June 22, 2006	57%	33%
Marist College	July 19, 2006	61%	34%
Rasmussen	August 5, 2006	61%	31%
Siena Research Institute	August 7, 2006	58%	32%
Quinnipiac	August 21, 2006	62%	26%
Marist College	August 23, 2006	60%	35%
Blue & Weprin	September 7, 2006	60%	33%
Marist College	September 8, 2006	62%	32%
Siena Research Institute	September 18, 2006	62%	33%
New York Times/CBS News	September 24–27, 2006	59%	27%
Quinnipiac	October 5, 2006	66%	31%
Zogby	October 9, 2006	53%	28%
Siena Research Institute	October 16, 2006	59%	32%
Quinnipiac	October 19, 2006	65%	30%
Marist College	October 20, 2006	67%	30%
Siena Research Institute	November 3, 2006	65%	28%
Marist College	November 3, 2006	65%	32%

=== Results ===

2006 United States Senate election, New York
Party	Candidate	Votes	%	±%
Democratic	Hillary Clinton	2,698,931	60.11%	+7.57
Independence	Hillary Clinton	160,705	3.58%	N/A
Working Families	Hillary Clinton	148,792	3.31%	+1.80
total	Hillary Clinton (incumbent)	3,008,428	67.00%	+11.73
Republican	John Spencer	1,212,902	27.01%	−13.18
Conservative	John Spencer	179,287	3.99%	+1.17
total	John Spencer	1,392,189	31.01%	−12.00
Green	Howie Hawkins	55,469	1.24%	+0.64
Libertarian	Jeff Russell	20,996	0.47%	+0.40
Socialist Workers	Roger Calero	6,967	0.16%	+0.12
Socialist Equality	Bill Van Auken	6,004	0.13%	N/A
Majority		1,616,239	36.00%	+23.74
Turnout		4,490,053	38.48%	
Democratic hold		Swing		

==== Results by county ====
County	Hillary Clinton Democratic		John Spencer Republican		All others		Margin		Total votes cast
County	#	%	#	%	#	%	#	%	Total votes cast
Albany	76,494	69.0%	28,709	25.9%	5,736	5.2%	47,785	43.1%	110,939
Allegany	6,334	46.8%	6,739	49.7%	474	3.5%	-405	-2.9%	13,547
Bronx	159,792	88.6%	17,086	9.5%	3,388	1.9%	142,706	79.1%	180,266
Broome	36,848	57.5%	24,291	37.9%	2,898	4.6%	12,557	19.6%	64,037
Cattaraugus	11,742	52.2%	10,031	44.6%	704	3.1%	1,711	7.6%	22,477
Cayuga	17,207	62.4%	9,348	33.9%	1,016	3.7%	7,859	28.5%	27,571
Chautauqua	20,126	53.7%	16,171	43.2%	1,178	3.1%	3,955	10.5%	37,475
Chemung	15,179	57.2%	10,669	40.2%	668	2.6%	4,510	17.0%	26,516
Chenango	8,071	52.6%	6,422	41.8%	858	5.6%	1,649	10.8%	15,351
Clinton	14,788	62.6%	7,902	33.4%	946	4.0%	6,886	29.2%	23,636
Columbia	14,353	59.2%	8,577	35.4%	1,306	5.4%	5,776	23.8%	24,236
Cortland	8,622	57.1%	5,727	37.9%	746	4.9%	2,895	19.2%	15,095
Delaware	7,376	49.9%	6,701	45.3%	718	4.9%	675	4.6%	14,795
Dutchess	45,536	54.7%	33,790	40.6%	2,986	4.6%	11,746	14.1%	83,212
Erie	177,051	62.4%	95,848	33.8%	11,010	3.9%	81,203	28.6%	283,909
Essex	7,007	54.9%	5,198	40.7%	560	4.3%	1,809	14.2%	12,765
Franklin	7,798	64.0%	3,973	32.6%	410	3.3%	3,825	31.4%	12,181
Fulton	8,262	55.8%	6,030	40.7%	526	3.5%	2,232	15.1%	14,818
Genesee	9,272	50.0%	8,700	46.9%	568	3.1%	572	3.1%	18,540
Greene	8,477	50.0%	7,641	45.1%	820	4.8%	836	4.9%	16,938
Hamilton	1,097	41.2%	1,445	54.2%	122	4.6%	−348	−13.0%	2,664
Herkimer	10,600	54.3%	8,177	41.9%	736	3.7%	2,423	12.4%	19,513
Jefferson	15,384	60.8%	9,237	36.5%	702	2.8%	6,147	24.3%	25,323
Kings	294,625	82.3%	48,295	13.5%	15,168	4.2%	246,330	68.8%	358,088
Lewis	3,909	53.1%	3,168	43.0%	288	4.0%	741	10.1%	7,365
Livingston	10,149	50.5%	9,103	45.3%	826	4.1%	1,046	5.2%	20,078
Madison	12,128	55.4%	8,783	40.1%	992	4.4%	3,345	15.3%	21,903
Monroe	141,823	61.1%	83,134	35.8%	7,216	3.1%	58,689	25.3%	232,173
Montgomery	8,335	59.9%	5,088	36.5%	502	3.6%	3,247	24.4%	13,925
Nassau	221,110	59.7%	139,775	37.7%	9,502	2.6%	81,335	22.0%	370,387
New York	316.367	83.4%	40,471	10.7%	22,468	5.9%	275,896	72.7%	379,306
Niagara	37,582	59.0%	24,535	38.3%	1,756	2.8%	13,317	20.7%	64,143
Oneida	41,582	57.3%	28,710	39.5%	2,334	3.3%	12,872	17.8%	72,626
Onondaga	98,116	62.5%	50,643	32.3%	8,202	5.4%	47,473	30.2%	156,961
Ontario	19,264	56.4%	13,847	40.5%	1,038	3.0%	5,417	15.9%	34,149
Orange	50,280	56.2%	36,065	40.3%	3,200	3.6%	14,215	15.9%	89,545
Orleans	5,415	49.8%	5,119	47.0%	350	4.2%	296	2.8%	10,884
Oswego	18,612	57.4%	12,272	37.8%	1,552	4.8%	6,340	19.6%	32,436
Otsego	10,467	54.8%	7,379	38.6%	1,246	6.5%	3,088	16.2%	19,092
Putnam	15,690	50.9%	13,834	44.9%	1,314	4.3%	1,856	6.0%	30,838
Queens	254,267	79.3%	57,352	17.9%	9,136	2.8%	196,915	61.4%	320,755
Rensselaer	33,986	61.5%	18,769	33.9%	2,534	4.6%	15,217	27.6%	55,289
Richmond	46,666	56.8%	33,356	40.6%	2,160	2.6%	13,310	16.2%	82,182
Rockland	47,738	59.2%	30,100	37.3%	2,754	3.4%	17,638	21.9%	80,592
St. Lawrence	19,085	66.8%	8,525	29.8%	962	3.4%	10,560	37.0%	28,572
Saratoga	45,485	56.1%	32,151	39.7%	3,436	4.2%	13,334	16.4%	81,072
Schenectady	32,131	62.6%	16,980	33.1%	2,204	4.4%	15,151	29.5%	51,315
Schoharie	5,589	50.4%	4,965	44.7%	546	4.9%	624	5.7%	11,100
Schuyler	3,187	51.7%	2,617	42.5%	358	5.8%	570	9.2%	6,162
Seneca	6,377	60.7%	3,747	35.7%	386	3.7%	2,630	25.0%	10,510
Steuben	13,561	48.2%	13,602	48.4%	956	3.4%	-41	-0.2%	28,119
Suffolk	210,104	58.4%	137,964	38.4%	11,446	3.1%	72,140	20.0%	359,514
Sullivan	12,094	59.4%	7,309	35.9%	944	5.6%	4,785	23.5%	20,347
Tioga	8,025	49.8%	7,478	46.4%	606	3.9%	547	3.4%	16,109
Tompkins	19,813	63.9%	7,946	25.6%	3,230	10.4%	11,867	38.3%	30,989
Ulster	36,538	58.8%	20,580	33.1%	4,978	8.0%	15,958	25.7%	62,098
Warren	12,930	56.9%	8,851	39.0%	930	4.1%	4,079	17.9%	22,711
Washington	9,990	55.1%	7,216	39.8%	916	5.1%	2,774	15.3%	18,122
Wayne	13,337	50.6%	12,146	46.1%	866	3.3%	1,191	4.5%	26,349
Westchester	174,217	65.1%	82,273	30.8%	11,002	4.1%	91,944	34.3%	267,492
Wyoming	5,992	46.6%	6,504	50.5%	374	2.8%	-512	-3.9%	12,870
Yates	4,176	55.5%	3,125	41.6%	218	2.9%	1,051	13.9%	7,519
Totals	3,008,428	67.0%	1,392,189	31.0%	89,436	2.0%	1,616,239	36.0%	4,490,053

Counties that flipped from Republican to Democratic

- Broome (largest municipality: Binghamton)
- Cattaraugus (largest municipality: Olean)
- Chautauqua (largest municipality: Jamestown)
- Chemung (largest municipality: Elmira)
- Chenango (largest municipality: Norwich)
- Clinton (largest municipality: Plattsburgh)
- Columbia (largest municipality: Hudson)
- Cortland (largest municipality: Cortland)
- Delaware (largest municipality: Sidney)
- Dutchess (County Seat: Poughkeepsie)
- Essex (largest municipality: Ticonderoga)
- Fulton (largest municipality: Gloversville)
- Genesee (largest municipality: Batavia)
- Greene (largest municipality: Catskill)
- Herkimer (largest municipality: German Flatts)
- Jefferson (largest municipality: Le Ray)
- Lewis (largest municipality: Lowville)
- Livingston (largest municipality: Geneseo)
- Madison (largest municipality: Oneida)
- Monroe (largest municipality: Rochester)
- Montgomery (largest municipality: Amsterdam)
- Nassau (largest municipality: Hempstead)
- Oneida (largest municipality: Utica)
- Ontario (largest municipality: Geneva)
- Orange (largest municipality: Kiryas Joel)
- Orleans (largest municipality: Albion)
- Oswego (largest municipality: Oswego)
- Otsego (largest municipality: Oneonta)
- Putnam (largest municipality: Lake Carmel)
- Rockland (County Seat: New City)
- Richmond (Staten Island, borough of New York City)
- Saratoga (largest municipality: Saratoga Springs)
- Schoharie (largest municipality: Cobleskill)
- Schuyler (largest municipality: Watkins Glen)
- Seneca (largest municipality: Seneca Falls)
- Suffolk (largest municipality: Brookhaven)
- Sullivan (largest municipality: Monticello)
- Tioga (largest municipality: Waverly)
- Ulster (largest municipality: Kingston)
- Warren (largest municipality: Glens Falls)
- Washington (largest municipality: Hudson Falls)
- Wayne (largest municipality: Newark)
- Yates (largest municipality: Penn Yan)

== Analysis ==
Clinton's victory margin over her Republican opponent (67.31%) was a significant gain over her showing in the 2000 Senate race against Rick Lazio (55.43%). She carried all but four of New York's sixty-two counties. Clinton's 2006 margin did not quite equal the percentage received by Eliot Spitzer in the concurrent gubernatorial race (69.29%) nor by Chuck Schumer in his 2004 Senate re-election campaign (71.24%), both of which had also been against little-known Republican opponents.

Clinton was criticized by some Democrats for spending too much in a one-sided contest, while some supporters were concerned she did not leave more funds for a potential presidential bid in 2008. In the following months she transferred $10 million of her Senate funds toward her 2008 presidential campaign. Clinton fell short in her 2008 presidential nomination bid, served as U.S. Secretary of State for four years, and then ran again in the 2016 United States presidential election but suffered a general election loss.

== See also ==
- 2006 United States Senate elections
- 2006 New York gubernatorial election
