= Brick by Brick: A Civil Rights Story =

- movie poster
- Genre: Documentary
- Directed by: Bill Kavanagh
- Country of origin: United States
- Original language: English

Production
- Producers: Bill Kavanagh; Linda Porto
- Cinematography: Peter Stein
- Editor: Sylke Froechtenigt
- Running time: 53 min
- Production company: Kavanagh Productions Inc

Original release
- Release: 2007

Brick by Brick: A Civil Rights Story is a 2007 documentary film, produced and directed by Bill Kavanagh. The story follows three Yonkers, New York families from the 1970s to the 1990s as they navigated a protracted and bitter confrontation in the city over housing and school desegregation. The documentary also recounts the heroic efforts of grassroots activists to keep the battle alive to address racial isolation and housing discrimination in Yonkers, as well as the infamous 1988 confrontation between the Federal courts and the City of Yonkers over the city's contempt of court orders. Westchester County civil rights activist Winston Ross is among those portrayed in the film, which details his youth in Yonkers' Runyon Heights neighborhood and his years in the city's public schools.

Lawrence Downes of The New York Times described the documentary as "a sober warning about the present day." Downes asserted that, "America — never mind Yonkers — still grapples with unsettled issues of poverty and race, and until that conundrum is resolved, it will keep reasserting itself in new and troubling ways."

A dramatization of the 1988 confrontation is encapsulated in the HBO miniseries Show Me a Hero (2015), largely based on the Lisa Belkin non-fiction book. Many of the political actors and characters in Show Me a Hero are portrayed in the original documentary, including Nick Wasicsko, the youngest mayor in the city's history, who figured prominently in the 1988 crisis.

== Release ==
Brick by Brick: A Civil Rights Story premiered on WNET in February 2007 and was widely shown on public television stations and film festivals nationwide over the following years.
