= Phil Amicone =

American politician (born 1949)

Philip A. Amicone
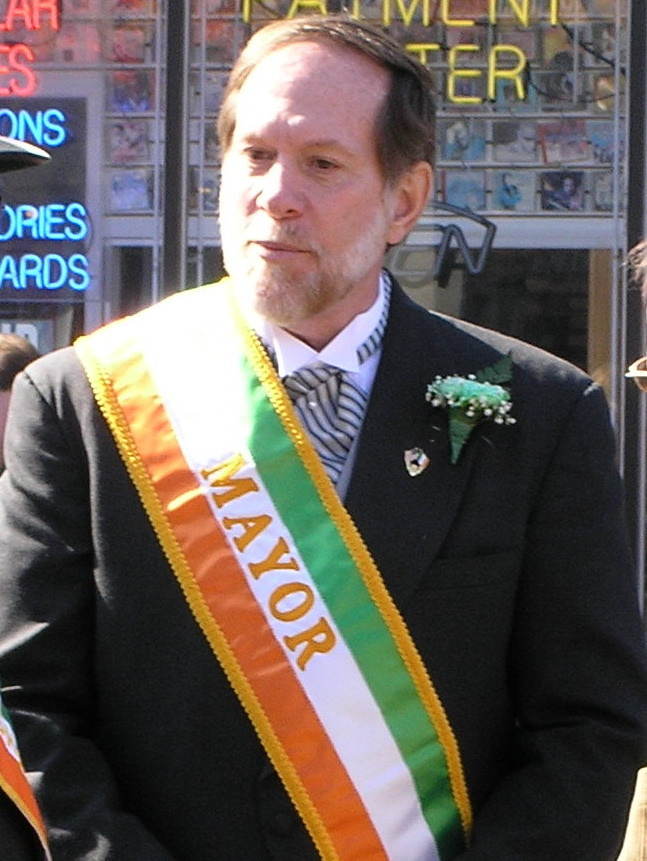

41st Mayor of Yonkers
- In office January 1, 2004 – January 1, 2012
- Preceded by: John Spencer
- Succeeded by: Mike Spano

Personal details
- Born: March 30, 1949 (age 77) Yonkers, New York, U.S.
- Party: Republican
- Spouse: Kay Terry Amicone
- Education: Manhattan College (BS); New York University (MS)

Philip A. Amicone (born March 30, 1949) is an American politician who was the 41st Mayor of Yonkers, New York. He took office on January 1, 2004, after serving eight years as Deputy Mayor.

== Career ==
As Deputy Mayor he was involved in all phases of the city's redevelopment. He was also responsible for the day-to-day operations of the city departments.

Prior to becoming Deputy Mayor of Yonkers, Amicone was Commissioner of the Department of Building for the City of White Plains. Before his employment in White Plains, he worked for The Port Authority of NY & NJ and the United States Environmental Protection Agency.

Amicone is a licensed Professional Engineer. He was awarded a Bachelor of Civil Engineering in 1971 from Manhattan College and a Masters of Civil Engineering from New York University.

In 1970, he married Kay Terry. They have three sons: Joseph, Brendan and Matthew. They are also the grandparents of their first grandchild, Julia Kaylin Amicone.

As mayor, he was a member of the Mayors Against Illegal Guns Coalition, a bi-partisan group with a stated goal of "making the public safer by getting illegal guns off the streets." The Coalition is co-chaired by Boston Mayor Thomas Menino and New York City Mayor Michael Bloomberg.

Additionally as Mayor, Amicone spearheaded two major developments in Yonkers - the Yonkers Downtown Projects, and the Ridge Hill project.

Under the Yonkers Downtown Project, Amicone introduced a three-pronged plan that would bring more than 3,500 apartments, almost 4,000 parking spaces and more than 4.5 million square feet of new construction to downtown Yonkers. In November 2011, after many years of organizing, waters began to flow above ground in downtown Yonkers for the first time in 90 years.

The Ridge Hill project created Yonkers’ first outdoor mall, with a multiplex cinema, its own Main St. and a water, light, and fire show. A Whole Foods, Lord & Taylor, L.L. Bean, medical building, and four-phase residential component were also developed. The development sits on a ridge (hence the name) overlooking the countryside, and is less than eight minutes from the nearest train station. The idea was to give residents a living experience with an easy walk to restaurants, stores and medical facilities.

However, Mayor Amicone's tenure was not free of controversy. In November 2011, at the end of Amicone's second and final term in office, the City Council voted to settle a federal court verdict against Mayor Phil Amicone for illegally pulling copies of a newspaper that was sharply critical of him off city streets. The paper claimed Amicone in 2007 ordered city employees to scoop up news racks and police to ticket newspaper distributors after the Westchester Guardian ran articles and headlines sharply critical of him.

The settlement required the city to pay $393,000 in damages to readers and employees of the weekly Westchester Guardian. But it would not hold the mayor personally liable — even though he was the main target of the newspaper's original lawsuit. The settlement would override a $170,000 personal judgment of punitive damages against Amicone made as part of the case that was set to be finalized by a federal judge.

In April 2013, the Yonkers City Council again voted to pass a $100,000 settlement to be paid by the Yonkers taxpayers, again on behalf of former mayor Amicone, for his making false defamatory comments against Mr. Zherka, publisher of the Westchester Guardian, as part of a separate lawsuit filed against Mr. Amicone. The entire defense for the former mayor was funded by the City of Yonkers, even though he was the main target of the lawsuits.

Political offices
Preceded by John Spencer	Mayor of Yonkers; 2004 - 2012	Succeeded by Mike Spano
