= Mike Spano =

American politician

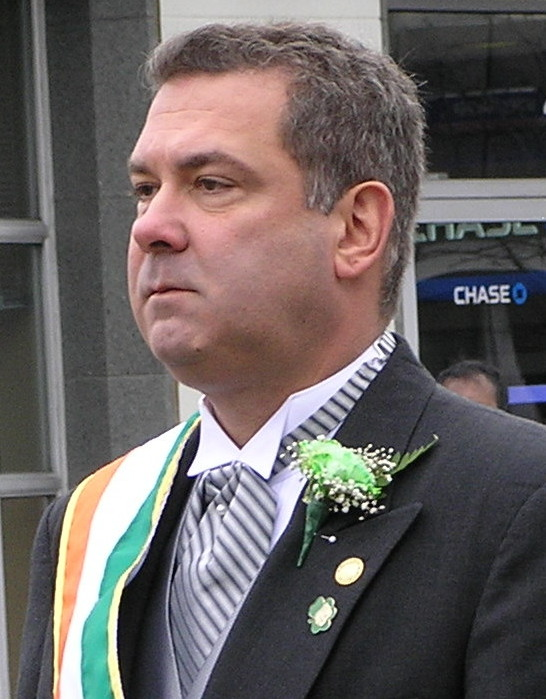
- Spano at the 2012 St. Patrick's Day parade in Yonkers

42nd Mayor of Yonkers
- Incumbent
- Assumed office January 1, 2012
- Deputy: Steve Levy
- Preceded by: Phil Amicone

Member of the New York State Assembly
- In office January 1, 1995 – December 31, 2011
- Preceded by: Cecile Singer
- Succeeded by: Shelley Mayer
- Constituency: 87th district (1995–2002); 93rd district (2003–2011)
- In office January 1, 1992 – December 31, 1992
- Preceded by: Terence Zaleski
- Succeeded by: Cecile Singer (redistricting)
- Constituency: 89th district

Personal details
- Born: Michael Joseph Spano; April 22, 1964 (age 62) Yonkers, New York, U.S.
- Party: Republican (before 2007); Democratic (2007–present)
- Spouse: Mary Calvi
- Children: 3
- Relatives: Nick Spano (brother)
- Education: Manhattan University (attended)
- Website: Campaign website

Michael Joseph Spano (born April 22, 1964) is an American politician who is the 42nd mayor of Yonkers, New York. He is a member of the Democratic Party. A former Republican, he served as a member of the New York State Assembly.

== Biography ==
Born and raised in Yonkers, New York, Spano is the ninth of sixteen children born to Josephine and Leonard Spano (1930–2019). Spano was first elected to the New York State Assembly in 1992 as the assembly's youngest member. Due to the state's reapportionment plan, his seat was eliminated later that same year. However, he ran again in 1994 and continued to serve in the New York State Assembly for nearly a decade until he chose not to run for re-election.

Within the private sector, Spano worked for a New York governmental relations firm and served on the Board of Directors for Leake and Watts Services. After his children became school-aged, he decided to return to public service and ran successfully once again for the State Assembly where he represented the people of Yonkers in the 93rd Assembly District.

On November 8, 2011, Spano was elected as mayor of the City of Yonkers, New York. During his tenure, Spano has passed two consecutive bipartisan budgets that included historic investment in education and kept taxes within the New York State property tax cap.

He was reelected to a second term as mayor in 2015.

In 2019, Spano was reelected to a third term as mayor following a revision in the city charter which overturned term limits by the Yonkers City Council. Spano had previously said he would not seek a third term, stating, "even if they did overturn term limits, as much as I love being mayor, I wouldn’t seek a third term."

In 2022, the Yonkers City Council voted to extend term limits for the second time for Mayor Spano. Citizens of Yonkers challenged the extension in New York State court, but the change in local law was upheld.

In May 2023, the Westchester County District Attorney's Office received a letter calling for an ethics investigation into alleged "nepotism, abuse of taxpayer dollars, corruption and abuse of power" under Spano's administration. The letter was prompted by media reports regarding Spano family members employed by the City of Yonkers. As of April 27, 2023, it was reported that at least 15 members of the Spano family were employed by the City of Yonkers, with the family collectively earning "at least $2 million annually" from the City. Spano has denied the allegations.

Spano is also a member of numerous community organizations such as the Yonkers Chamber of Commerce, Access Westchester, Exchange Club of Yonkers, Sons of Italy, and an Honorary Member (non-veteran) of the Armando Rauso AMVETS Post. He is also a former member of the board of directors of Westchester School for Special Children and donor to the Luis Pani foundation.

Spano appeared on the TV show Impractical Jokers during James "Murr" Murray's punishment that took place at Yonkers City Hall in the episode "Speech Impediment".

A lifelong Yonkers resident, Spano has been married to CBS newscaster Mary Calvi since 1996 and has three children.

Political offices
Preceded by Phil Amicone	Mayor of Yonkers; 2012–present	Incumbent
