= Edith P. Welty =

Yonkers reformer and mayor

Mayor of Yonkers, New York
- In office 1949-09-12 – 1949-12-31
- Preceded by: Curtis E. Frank
- Succeeded by: Kristen Kristensen

Member of the Yonkers Common Council
- In office 1940-01-01 – 1949-12-31

Personal details
- Born: September 10, 1881 Cleveland, Ohio
- Died: December 31, 1957 (aged 76) St. John’s Riverside Hospital, Yonkers, New York
- Resting place: Ferncliff Cemetery and Mausoleum, Hartsdale, New York
- Occupation: Reformer, politician
- Known for: Only female mayor of Yonkers; advocate of non-partisan, professional civic reform and council–manager government

Edith Parmenter Welty (September 10, 1881 – December 31, 1957) was an American civic reformer and the only female mayor of Yonkers, New York. A longtime advocate of non-partisan, professional municipal government organized under the council–manager government model, she served on the Yonkers Common Council for a decade and became mayor in 1949 following the resignation of her predecessor, Curtis E. Frank. Her tenure reflected the persistence of Yonkers’ mid-century good-government reform movement, though her coalition’s control of the Common Council was intermittent and often contested.

== Early life and education ==
Born Edith Harris Parmenter in Cleveland, Ohio, she later used the name Edith Parmenter Welty after her marriage to Harry T. Welty. She attended public schools and earned a B.A. from Western Reserve University (now Case Western Reserve University). After marrying engineer Harry T. Welty, she moved to Yonkers, New York, in 1911 when he joined the New York Central Railroad. In her early years in Yonkers she performed as a pianist, violinist, and singer at local events and was active in community organizations.

== Entry into civic and political life ==
Welty became involved in reform politics through the League of Women Voters, where, as a new member at age 53, she was asked to serve on a panel discussing city management. Her persuasive advocacy led the League to appoint her chair of a committee educating voters about the council–manager system. She helped organize a citizens’ “Committee of One Hundred” that continued the League’s work and promoted adoption of the council–manager charter, a measure that was defeated twice before finally winning approval from Yonkers voters in 1938.

=== The Weldy candidacy incident (1939) ===
Shortly after Welty announced her 1939 candidacy for the Yonkers Common Council, a woman named Elizabeth Weldy entered the race as an independent candidate. Contemporary press coverage noted the striking similarity of their names under the city’s proportional-representation ballot, in which “Weldy” and “Welty” would appear consecutively in alphabetical order.

As part of the unusual circumstances surrounding Weldy’s candidacy, Welty visited Weldy’s apartment shortly after Weldy entered the race in order to confirm that she was in fact a candidate and to invite her to speak at one of Welty’s public “Wake Up Yonkers” meetings, at which other council candidates were invited to appear. Weldy later stated that Welty had asked her to withdraw from the race, a characterization Welty disputed in a sworn affidavit published in the Herald Statesman. According to Welty’s affidavit, Weldy told her during the visit that she expected to be away in Virginia during the fall campaign, and a man present in the apartment stated that Weldy “had been coaxed into this” and would withdraw.

During the campaign period, reporters described persistent difficulty in contacting Weldy, noting that repeated visits to her home were unsuccessful and that her photograph and biographical sketch were submitted anonymously to the newspaper’s night box.

Later in October, affidavits filed with the Westchester County Board of Elections alleged that dozens of signatures on Weldy’s nominating petitions were duplicate or invalid. Counsel for the Manager League advised that Welty could seek a court order to have Weldy’s name removed from the ballot; election officials, however, stated that doing so would require reprinting all proportional-representation ballots at an estimated cost of $500. Welty declined to pursue the challenge, explaining that she was unwilling to impose that expense on city taxpayers.

Weldy did not actively campaign and did not appear at candidate forums, though she received 159 first-round votes when the proportional-representation tally began on November 9, 1939. The final count concluded five days later, with Welty elected on the 21st count.

In 1941, a Yonkers resident, Joseph Borish, was reported to have served eight months in the county penitentiary following a perjury conviction related to forged signatures on Weldy’s nominating petitions, confirming the earlier findings of petition irregularities.

=== 1939 election and reform majority ===
In the 1939 election, Welty and one other “Manager League” reform candidate were elected to the five-member Common Council, joining two Democrats and one Republican. When the Republican caucused with the Democrats to choose the mayor, reformers lost the initial majority they had hoped to secure.

Two years later, the reform group gained a three-member majority on the Common Council, electing its own choice as mayor and asserting a merit-based, professional approach to city administration in place of the patronage practices that had previously dominated.

Throughout the 1940s, Welty and her allies continued to promote non-partisan, professional management and to defend the council–manager form of government. In 1945 she was in the minority when a three-to-two Common Council majority aligned with the political machine voted to remove City Manager Montgomery, prompting public protests from several hundred citizens in the council chamber.

== Mayoral term ==
When Mayor Curtis E. Frank announced his resignation in June 1949 to become vice president and general counsel of the Reuben H. Donnelley Corporation of New York and Chicago, effective September 1, 1949, the city charter required that his successor be determined according to the results of the 1947 proportional-representation council election. Election officials and a proportional-representation specialist were brought in to review the original ballots, and the recount showed that Welty had received the second-highest number of votes—just 277 more than the runner-up, Acting Mayor John J. Whalen. She completed the remaining three and a half months of Frank’s term, from September 12 through December 31, 1949, becoming Yonkers’ first and only female mayor. Her brief administration emphasized continuity and non-partisan professionalism, maintaining the principles of the reform movement that had shaped Yonkers politics since the mid 1930s.

== Later life and legacy ==
After leaving office, Welty remained active in civic and charitable affairs, including the Salvation Army, the YWCA, and the Yonkers Visiting Nurse Association. She died on December 31, 1957, at St. John’s Riverside Hospital in Yonkers at age 76, and was buried at Ferncliff Cemetery in Hartsdale, New York. Her career is remembered as a significant chapter in Yonkers’ reform-era history and an early example of women’s leadership in New York municipal government.

== Personal life ==
Welty was married to Harry T. Welty, an engineer for the New York Central Railroad, and they had three children: sons Alan M. Welty and Harry T. Welty Jr., and a daughter, Alice E. Welty. Alice Welty, a radio and film script writer, died at the family home in Yonkers on July 24, 1949, after an illness of several months, at age 42—just months before Edith Welty became mayor later that year.

Contemporaries described Mrs. Welty as an accomplished musician, an enthusiastic tennis and bridge player, and a devoted participant in local cultural and charitable organizations. She was reportedly working on an autobiographical manuscript at the time of her death in 1957, but no copy has been located in public archives.
