= New York Times Co. v. Tasini =

- Supreme Court of the United States

Argued March 28, 2001 Decided June 25, 2001
- Full case name: The New York Times Company, Inc., et al., Petitioners v. Jonathan Tasini, et al.
- Docket no.: 00-201
- Citations: 533 U.S. 483 (more) 121 S. Ct. 2381; 150 L. Ed. 2d 500; 2001 U.S. LEXIS 4667

Holding
- Section 201(c) does not authorize the copying at issue here. The Publishers are not sheltered by §201(c) because the Databases reproduce and distribute articles standing alone and not in context, not "as part of that particular collective work" to which the author contributed, "as part of … any revision" thereof, or "as part of … any later collective work in the same series."

Court membership
- Chief Justice William Rehnquist Associate Justices John P. Stevens · Sandra Day O'Connor; Antonin Scalia · Anthony Kennedy; David Souter · Clarence Thomas; Ruth Bader Ginsburg · Stephen Breyer

Case opinions
- Majority: Ginsburg, joined by Rehnquist, O'Connor, Scalia, Kennedy, Souter, Thomas
- Dissent: Stevens, joined by Breyer

New York Times Co. v. Tasini, 533 U.S. 483 (2001), is a leading decision by the United States Supreme Court on the issue of copyright in the contents of a newspaper database. It held that The New York Times, in licensing back issues of the newspaper for inclusion in electronic databases such as LexisNexis, could not license the works of freelance journalists contained in the newspapers.

The lawsuit brought by members of the UAW's National Writers Union against the New York Times Company, Newsday Inc., Time Inc., University Microfilms International, and LexisNexis. The freelance writers, including lead plaintiff Jonathan Tasini, charged copyright infringement due to the use and reuse in electronic media of articles initially licensed to be published in print form. In a 7–2 ruling delivered by Justice Ginsburg, the Court affirmed the copyright privileges of freelance writers whose works were originally published in periodicals and then provided by the publishers to electronic databases without explicit permission of, or compensation to, the writers. As a result of the decision, plaintiffs won a compensation pool of $18 million.

== History ==
The case was initially heard in the district court of Judge Sonia Sotomayor, who held that the publishers were within their rights according to the Copyright Act of 1976. This decision was reversed on appeal, and the Supreme Court affirmed the appellate court's reversal.

== Aftermath ==
The decision involved works generated by 27,000 authors, but it did not allocate any bargaining power to them. The New York Times Company responded to the decision by drafting an ultimatum for the authors. The authors could contact the Times and request that it continue to distribute their works online, but only on the conditions that the authors ask for no additional payment and that they release the Tasini decision's legal claim on the Times and the database licensees. Future freelance contracts with the New York Times included similar terms that allowed the Times to exploit the works in whatever ways the future may reveal.

== See also ==
- New York Times Co. v. Sullivan (1964)
- New York Times Co. v. United States (1971)
- List of United States Supreme Court cases, volume 533
