= Peter Stein (cinematographer) =

American cinematographer (born 1943)

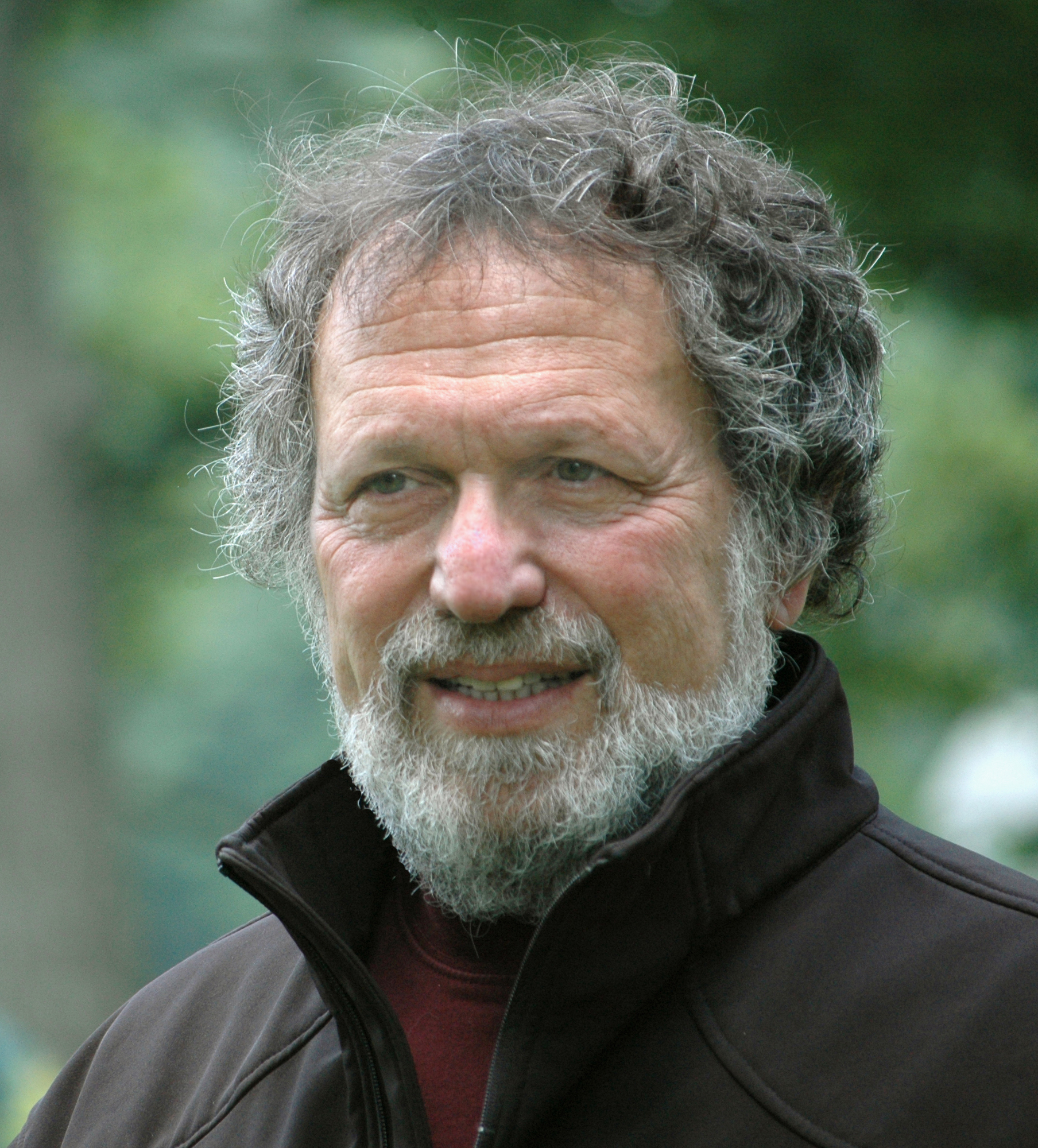
- Born: Peter Michael Stein; October 12, 1943 (age 83); New York City, New York, U.S.
- Occupations: Cinematographer, Professor
- Notable work: Pet Sematary
- Children: 2
- Website: petersteinasc.com

Peter Stein (born October 12, 1943) is an American cinematographer. His career of over three decades spans many themes and genres. His most well-known works define the cult horror films of the late 1980s and early 1990s including Pet Sematary, C.H.U.D., and Friday the 13th Part 2. He currently teaches cinematography in the graduate film program at New York University's Tisch School of the Arts and is a member of the American Society of Cinematographers (ASC). He was interviewed in a 2017 documentary film Unearthed & Untold: The Path to Pet Sematary.

== Selected filmography ==
- Friday the 13th Part 2 (1981)
- Reuben, Reuben (1983)
- C.H.U.D. (1984)
- Wildrose (1984)
- Izzy and Moe (1985, TV movie)
- A Great Wall (1986)
- The Parent Trap II (1986, TV movie)
- The Last Fling (1987, TV movie)
- The Wild Pair (1987)
- Elvis and Me (1988, TV movie)
- Ernest Saves Christmas (1988)
- Pet Semetary (1989)
- Brenda Starr (1989)
- Ernest Goes to Jail (1990)
- Graveyard Shift (1990)
- Night Visions (1990)
- Necessary Roughness (1991)
- Missing Pieces (1991)
- Desperate Choices: To Save My Child (1992, TV movie)
- Mr. Nanny (1993)
- The Con (1998, TV movie)
- Brick by Brick: A Civil Rights Story (2007)
