= Nick Wasicsko =

American politician

- Wasicsko in 1988

37th Mayor of Yonkers
- In office 1987–1989
- Preceded by: Angelo R. Martinelli
- Succeeded by: Henry Spallone

Member of the Yonkers City Council from the 2nd district
- In office 1992–1993

Member of the Yonkers City Council from the 7th ward
- In office 1986–1987

Personal details
- Born: Nicholas C. Wasicsko; May 13, 1959 Yonkers, New York
- Died: October 29, 1993 (aged 34) Oakland Cemetery in Yonkers, New York
- Cause of death: Suicide by gunshot
- Party: Democratic
- Spouse: Nay Noe (m. 1991)
- Education: Manhattan College (BA); New York Law School (JD)
- Profession: Police officer, attorney, politician

Nicholas C. Wasicsko (/wəˈsɪskoʊ/; May 13, 1959 – October 29, 1993) was an American politician from New York and the youngest-ever mayor of Yonkers, New York. As mayor he fought for the desegregation of public housing.

== Early life and education ==
Wasicsko was born May 13, 1959, in Yonkers, to Nicholas and Anne Slota Wasicsko. He was of Slovak descent. Wasicsko attended public schools in Yonkers. He graduated from Gorton High School in Yonkers in 1977.

Wasicsko graduated from Manhattan College in 1981 with a degree in government and served for a year as a county police officer. His father died in 1985. In 1986 and 1987 he served as 7th Ward councilman while simultaneously attending New York Law School, from which he was graduated in 1987, the same year he was elected mayor. He was admitted to the bar in New York and Connecticut.

== Career ==
On Nov. 3, 1987, at the age of 28, Wasicsko defeated six-term Republican-Conservative incumbent Angelo R. Martinelli, age 60, to become the youngest-ever mayor of Yonkers, and the youngest mayor in a major American city. Wasicsko won by a margin of 1,466 votes of the 42,700 cast.

The central concern during the 1987 election revolved around the court-ordered integration of public housing in Yonkers. As a candidate, Wasicsko advocated "for resisting the court-ordered integration by legal appeals." Martinelli and Wasicsko "had not taken dramatically opposite positions on the integration dispute, but ... Mayor Martinelli had become identified with much of the emotion surrounding the issue," contributing to his loss.

Wasicsko waged an aggressive battle to set in motion a housing desegregation plan for the city. Although he received numerous accolades for his position, including a runner-up citation for the 1991 John F. Kennedy Profile in Courage Award, opposition was equally strong, and he received death threats.

The city council initially signed a consent decree with the U.S. Department of Justice and the Yonkers NAACP on a housing plan, but in August 1988, on a procedural vote, the city council voted 4 to 3 to rescind its support for the binding consent decree. A federal court proposed fines to the city of Yonkers that would have risen within weeks to $1 million per day, and fines for the individual Yonkers city council members who opposed the integration plan of $500 per day, and would have jailed them within a month. On September 9, 1988, with the fines mounting, city services being curtailed, and 630 city employees about to be laid off, the city council relented, and the housing integration plan was approved.

As a result of the controversy, Wasicsko lost a bid for re-election as mayor in 1989. Once out of office, Wasicsko practiced law, taught at John Jay College of Criminal Justice, and hosted a local radio talk show. He returned to elected office in 1992 as 2nd District councilman. He was named Democratic minority leader.

In 1993 he made an unsuccessful primary run for City Council President.

== Death ==
Wasicsko was found dead of an apparent suicide at 5:20 p.m. on Friday, October 29, 1993, at the age of 34. He was found sitting against a tree on a grassy hill overlooking the grave of his father at Oakland Cemetery in Yonkers, New York, with a single gunshot wound in his head. He owned a licensed 38-caliber pistol, and the gun was found in his right hand. There was speculation at the time that Wasicsko feared an ongoing corruption investigation of the Yonkers Industrial Development Agency, of which Wasicsko was a board member and former chairman, would tarnish his reputation but investigators said they had no reason to believe Wasicsko was corrupt.

== Personal life ==
Wasicsko married Nay Noe, a former secretary, on May 18, 1991, at St. Casimir's Church in Yonkers. He lived with his wife and mother in a gabled green Victorian house in Yonkers.

== Media ==
In 1999, former New York Times writer Lisa Belkin wrote the book Show Me a Hero about Wasicsko and the desegregation case. A six-episode HBO television miniseries of the same name, based on the book, written by David Simon and journalist William F. Zorzi and directed by Paul Haggis, premiered on August 16, 2015. Oscar Isaac played Wasicsko and later won the Golden Globe Award for Best Actor – Miniseries or Television Film for his performance.

Brick by Brick: A Civil Rights Story, a 2007 documentary film about the Yonkers desegregation struggle, featured Wasicsko prominently as a lonely proponent of compliance with federal court orders to build low income and affordable housing in 1988.

Political offices
Preceded by Angelo R. Martinelli	Mayor of Yonkers; 1988–1989	Succeeded by Henry Spallone
