= Terence M. Zaleski =

American politician

39th Mayor of Yonkers
- In office January 1, 1992 – December 31, 1995
- Preceded by: Henry Spallone
- Succeeded by: John Spencer

Member of the New York State Assembly from the 83rd district
- In office January 7, 1987 – December 31, 1991
- Preceded by: Nicholas Spano
- Succeeded by: Mike Spano

Personal details
- Born: January 15, 1953 (age 73) Yonkers, New York, U.S.
- Party: Democratic
- Spouse: Lynn M. Zaleski
- Profession: Attorney

Terence M. Zaleski (born 1953) is an American politician from New York who was the 39th Mayor of Yonkers, New York. He took office on January 1, 1992, after serving the previous five years in the New York State Assembly.

== Early life and education ==
Zaleski graduated from Columbia Law School with a J.D. degree. He worked as a high school chemistry teacher.

== Career ==
He was a member of the New York State Assembly from 1987 to 1991, sitting in the 187th, 188th and 189th New York State Legislatures. During his time in the Assembly, he chaired a committee on the use of DNA tests in court cases. In the 1988 election, he was re-elected with 56% of the vote.

He was mayor of Yonkers from 1992 to 1995.

== Popular culture ==
A fictional version of Zaleski, played by Daniel Sauli, appears in the 2015 American miniseries Show Me a Hero, which was written by David Simon and journalist William F. Zorzi.

== Personal life ==
Zaleski's wife, Lynn, served as his campaign treasurer. They have at least one child, a son.

New York State Assembly
Preceded by Nicholas A. Spano	New York State Assembly; 83rd District; 1987–1991	Succeeded by Mike Spano
Political offices
Preceded by Henry Spallone	Mayor of Yonkers; 1992–1995	Succeeded by John Spencer
