= Jonathan Tasini =

American journalist

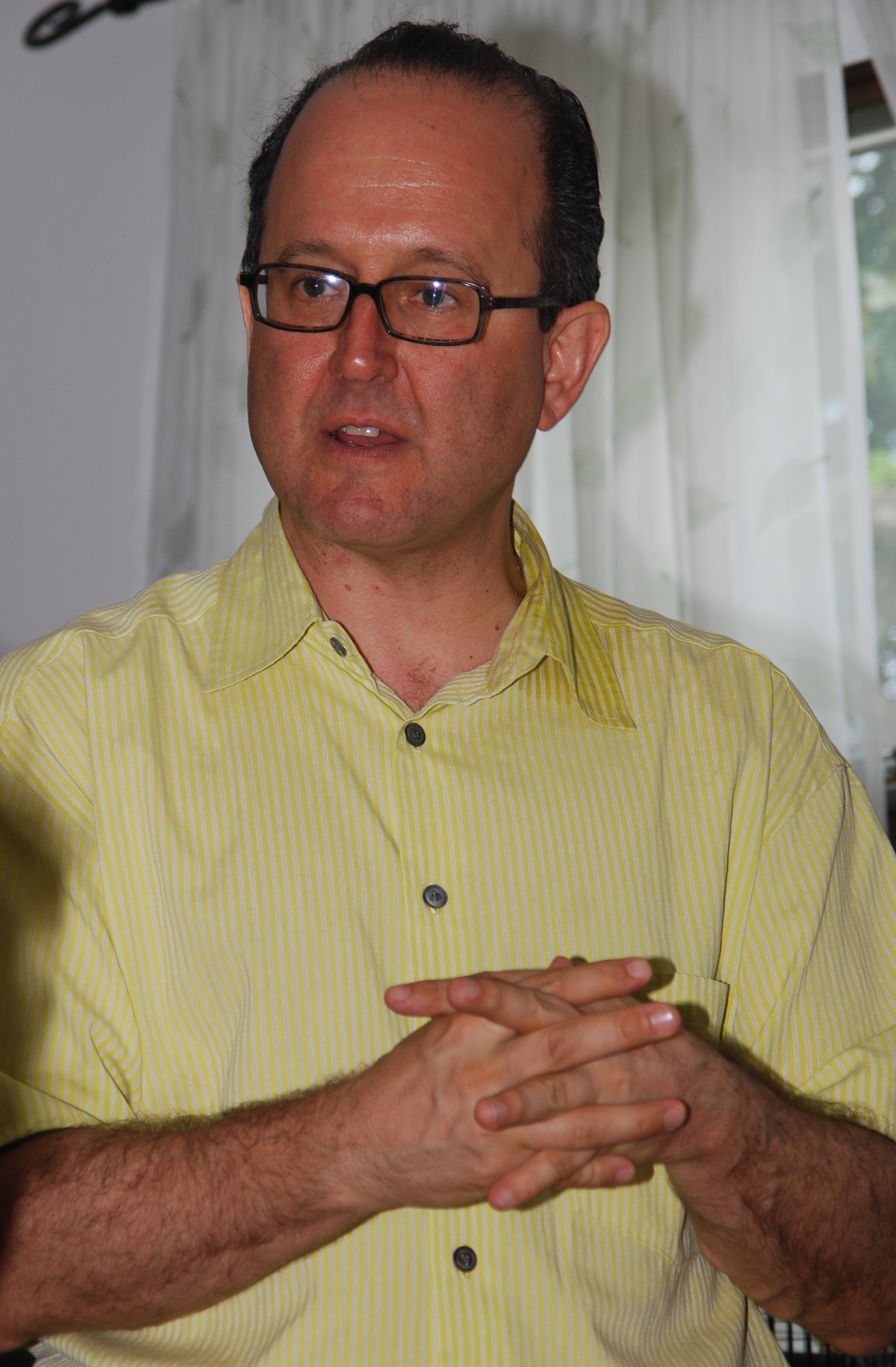
- Jonathan Tasini speaking at a 2009 campaign fundraiser on Staten Island

Personal details
- Born: Jonathan Bernard Yoav Tasini; October 18, 1956 (age 69) Houston, Texas, U.S.
- Party: Democratic
- Education: University of California, Los Angeles (BA)
- Occupation: Strategist, organizer, activist, commentator and writer

Jonathan Bernard Yoav Tasini (born October 18, 1956) is an American political strategist, organizer, activist, commentator and writer, focused on the topics of work, labor and the economy. On June 11, 2009, he announced that he would challenge New York U.S. Senator Kirsten Gillibrand in the Democratic primary for the 2010 U.S. Senate special election in New York. However, Tasini later decided to run instead for a seat in the House of Representatives in 2010.

He was the president of the National Writers Union from 1990 to 2003. In 2006, he unsuccessfully challenged incumbent U.S. Senator Hillary Clinton in the Democratic primary, principally because of the incumbent's vote for the Iraq Resolution which gave then President George W. Bush the authority to invade Iraq.

He is currently president of the Economic Future Group, a national consulting group. He also writes frequently for a labor and economy blog, Working Life.

== Early life and education ==
Tasini was born in Houston, Texas, though he spent much of his late childhood in Israel. Tasini's father, Betsalel Tasini, was a computer scientist who was born in Palestine and fought in the Haganah, Israel's pre-state army, and its strike force, the Palmach. Tasini lived with his father and stepmother in Israel for seven years and speaks fluent Hebrew. He completed high school in Israel and studied at Tel Aviv University. While there, he was also involved in Histadrut, a trade union. He earned a degree in political science from the University of California, Los Angeles.

== Career ==
=== National Writers Union ===
From 1990 to April 2003, he served as president of the National Writers Union (UAW Local 1981).

In 1993, Tasini was the lead plaintiff in the case of New York Times Co. v. Tasini, in which the Supreme Court of the United States ruled in favor of the copyright claims of writers whose work was republished in electronic databases without their permission. The ruling set an important precedent that led to a class-action lawsuit settlement of $18 million.

He also served in a wide variety of additional author and labor advocacy positions, including as a board member of the International Federation of Journalists and the National Academies of Sciences, Engineering, and Medicine’s Computer Science and Telecommunications Board, a joint industry-scientific-academic panel. He also was the founder of the Creators Federation, which sought to unite creators groups to work in concert.

Tasini remains the president emeritus of the NWU.

=== Writing ===
Tasini is a leading economics and labor writer who has analyzed economic and labor affairs for a wide variety of publications and organizations, including The Wall Street Journal, CNBC, Bloomberg Businessweek, Playboy, The Washington Post, The New York Times, The Los Angeles Times, and Newsday. He is the creator and publisher of Working Life, a central source of information, analysis and debate within organized labor and the general policy community, and one of the first blogs to devote itself entirely to work and the economy.

Tasini is the author of five books: The Essential Bernie Sanders and His Vision for America (2015); It's Not Raining, We’re Being Peed On: The Scam of the Deficit Crisis (2010); The Audacity of Greed: Free Markets, Corporate Thieves and The Looting of America (2009); They Get Cake, We Eat Crumbs: The Real Story Behind Today's Unfair Economy (1997); and The Edifice Complex: Rebuilding the American Labor Movement to Face the Global Economy (1995).

He wrote a paper on The Audacity of Timidity in which he is stated to be the Executive Director of the Labor Research Association.

=== 2006 Senate campaign ===
On December 6, 2005, Tasini announced his bid to challenge Senator Clinton for the Democratic nomination in the New York 2006 Senate election. Tasini, who needed to collect 15,000 valid signatures to force a primary with Clinton, submitted approximately 40,000 of them on July 13.

Tasini was endorsed by a number of prominent political activists, including Susan Sarandon, Cindy Sheehan, Barbara Ehrenreich, and Howard Zinn. On September 7, 2006, Gay City News endorsed Tasini's Senate candidacy, citing his support for same-sex marriage, and Clinton's stated opposition to legalizing same-sex marriage. In his campaign, Tasini emphasized his opposition to the 2003 invasion of Iraq and called for universal health care and curbs on corporate power as part of what he termed "New Rules For the Economy".

He wrote a book called It's Not Raining, We're Getting Peed On: The Scam of the Deficit Crisis in 2010, voicing his opinions about the current debt crises.

=== 2010 District Congressional campaign ===
On May 13, 2010 Tasini announced that he would be running for Congress, hoping to win the seat held by Charles Rangel, who had been a representative of the 15th district for 17 years. Tasini stated that he planned to "remain entirely energized about our mission to change the country". Tasini was endorsed by prominent actors and political activists, including Richard Dreyfuss and Armand Assante.

On September 14, 2010, Tasini finished fifth in the Democratic primary garnering 2,389 votes, or 5% of the total vote.

=== Controversy ===
In January 2018, Tasini published a message via Twitter that referenced both a fatal train crash involving Republican lawmakers and the decision by Representative Trey Gowdy not to seek re-election, which read, in part, "God is working hard today to clean up the stink."

== See also ==
- New York Times Co. v. Tasini
- United States Senate election in New York, 2006
