= K. T. McFarland =

American political commentator (born 1951)

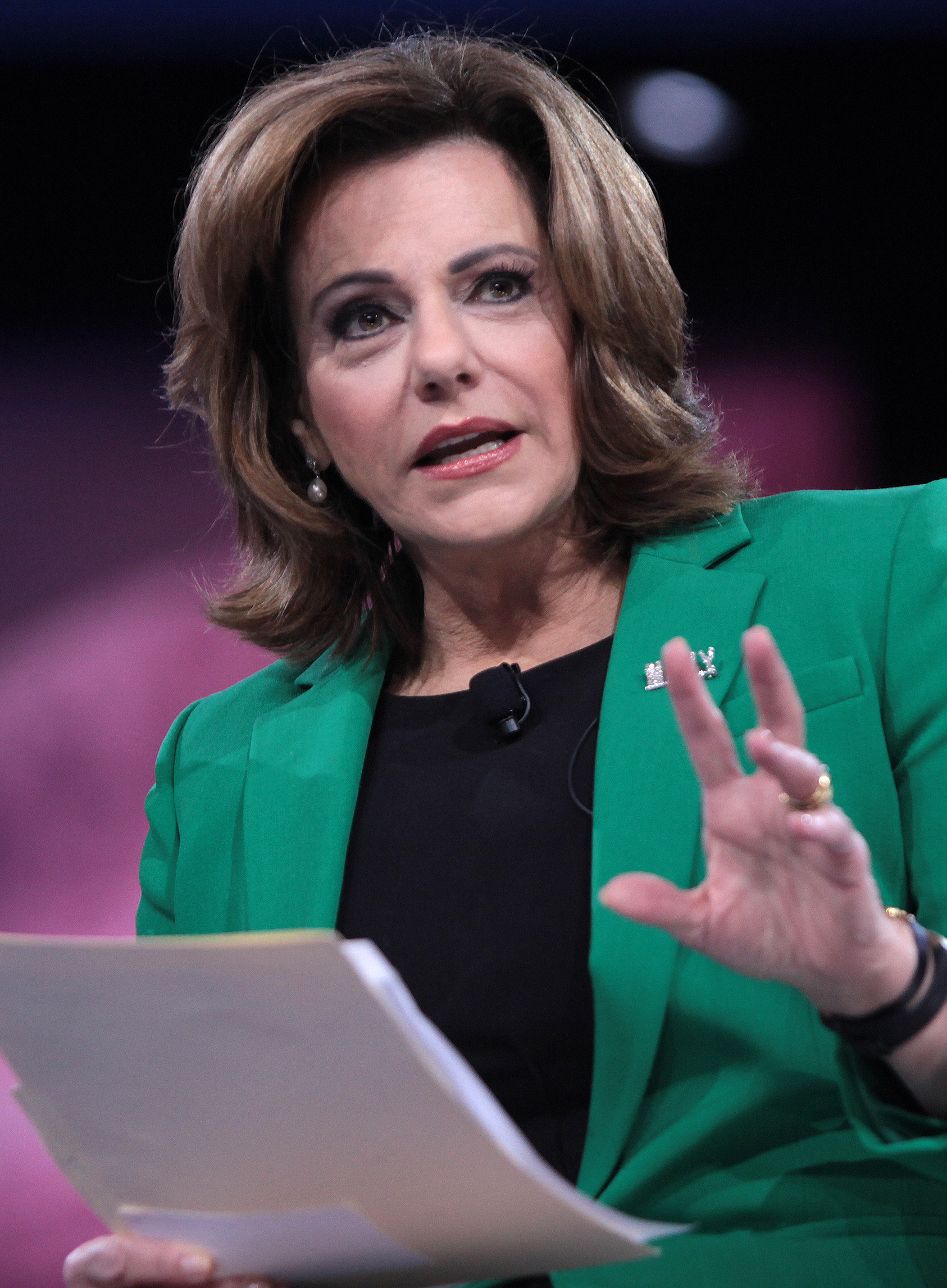

28th United States Deputy National Security Advisor
- In office January 20, 2017 – May 19, 2017
- President: Donald Trump
- Preceded by: Avril Haines
- Succeeded by: Ricky L. Waddell

Personal details
- Born: Kathleen M. Troia; July 22, 1951 (age 75) Madison, Wisconsin, U.S.
- Party: Republican
- Spouse: Alan McFarland
- Children: 3, including Fiona
- Education: George Washington University (BA); St Anne's College, Oxford (BA); Massachusetts Institute of Technology (attended)

Kathleen Troia McFarland (born Kathleen M. Troia; July 22, 1951) is an American political commentator, civil servant, author, and former political candidate.

McFarland began her political career in the 1970s as a night-shift typist and assistant press liaison for National Security Council staff. In the 1980s, during the Reagan administration, she worked in the Department of Defense as a speechwriter and served as Deputy Assistant Secretary of Defense for Public Affairs. In 2006, she ran unsuccessfully for the Republican nomination for the U.S. Senate in New York.

McFarland served as Deputy National Security Advisor under Michael Flynn in 2017 during the Donald Trump administration. She was asked to step down by Flynn's successor, H. R. McMaster, in April 2017, and was then nominated by Trump to the post of U.S. Ambassador to Singapore. McFarland removed her name from consideration for the ambassadorship in February 2018 due to concerns about her answers to questions related to links between Trump associates and Russian officials.

McFarland frequently appears on Fox News and has written three books.

== Early life and education ==
Kathleen Troia was born on July 22, 1951, in Madison, Wisconsin, where she grew up as the oldest of four siblings. Her father was a train dispatcher for the Chicago and North Western Railway. Troia has asserted that her father was physically abusive and had persistent rage issues. Her father denied these claims. Troia's brother, Tom Troia, has spoken out in his father's defense.

Troia had two brothers, Tom and Michael Troia. Troia graduated from Madison West High School in 1969.

Troia studied at the Elliott School of International Affairs of the George Washington University in Washington, D.C. In 1970, she worked part-time at the Nixon White House for Henry Kissinger's National Security Council staff. She was on the nighttime typing pool, which meant that she typed the President's Daily Brief. Intrigued by U.S. foreign policy and Nixon's 1972 China visit, Troia majored in Chinese studies, graduating from George Washington in 1973.

After working in the Ford administration, Troia studied on scholarship at Oxford University, where she earned a combined master's degree in Politics, Philosophy, and Economics.

Troia attended the Massachusetts Institute of Technology. While there, she studied nuclear weapons, China, and the Soviet Union for three years, but did not complete her Ph.D.

== Career ==
Troia (McFarland) as note taker during an October 1974 NSC event

=== Early career ===
Troia continued to work in the White House as a research assistant during the Ford administration, and at times assisted or filled in for the NSC press liaison. She is sometimes considered a Kissinger protégée. In December 1975, an Associated Press story quoted the 24-year Troia extolling Secretary of State Kissinger in keeping the world's image of the United States strong during the Nixon impeachment.

Troia returned to Washington, D.C., in 1981 following the election of Ronald Reagan as president and the new Republican majority in the U.S. Senate and became a member of the Senate Armed Services Committee staff, working for chair John Tower. There, she worked on the preparation of committee briefings and talking points.

=== Reagan administration ===
During the Reagan administration, when she was known informally as Kathy Troia, Troia started working as a speechwriter for U.S. Secretary of Defense Caspar Weinberger in March 1982. Specifically, she worked on his "Six Tests for the Use of U.S. Military Power" speech, sometimes considered a forerunner of the Powell Doctrine.

In December 1983, Troia was promoted to Principal Deputy to Michael I. Birch, the Assistant Secretary of Defense for Public Affairs. She later served as Pentagon spokesperson, with newspaper articles from that time describing her as a "senior Pentagon spokeswoman". She was reportedly under consideration for the Assistant Secretary position. She stayed in this position until approximately November 1984.

=== Career hiatus ===
Troia married Alan Roberts McFarland in 1985. After getting married, Troia was known as K.T. McFarland. Beginning in 1985, K.T. McFarland was a stay-at-home mother.

=== 2006 U.S. Senate campaign ===
In 2006, K.T. McFarland ran in the Republican primary in the United States Senate election in New York for a seat held by Democrat Hillary Clinton. She was a late entrant who was recruited once the candidacy of the leading Republican, Westchester County District Attorney Jeanine Pirro, imploded.

McFarland wanted to make a point by running as a Republican in New York, saying: "I spent 20 years of my life fighting against single party rule. It was called the Soviet Union and Communism then". McFarland described herself both as a "moderate Republican" and a "Reagan Republican". She is pro-choice. She ran into trouble with a March 2006 comment that appeared to allege that the Clinton campaign had been flying helicopters low over her Southampton, New York, house and spying on her, or that Clinton forces had rented an apartment across from her $18 million duplex on Park Avenue; she later said she had been joking, but the episodes upset her. The race between McFarland and her opponent, former Yonkers Mayor John Spencer, was ugly.

McFarland's candidacy was plagued by allegations that she overstated her credentials. Specifically, The New York Times reported that McFarland's claim that she had written part of Ronald Reagan's "Star Wars" speech was false, that her contention that she had been the highest-ranking woman of her time at the Reagan Pentagon was false, and that her claim that she had been the first female professional staff member of the Senate Armed Services Committee was false. Also, the Spencer campaign objected to her assertion that she had held a civilian rank equivalent to that of a three-star general.

McFarland's inconsistent record of voting in prior New York state elections also became an issue, with her having failed to vote in six of the past 14 elections. McFarland also unlawfully maintained voting addresses in two different places at the same time, sometimes voting in one municipality and sometimes voting in another. She emphasized that she had never voted twice in one election, promising to cancel one of her voter registrations. By late June, her campaign was nearly out of money, and she loaned $100,000 to the campaign. On August 22, McFarland suspended her campaign after her daughter was caught shoplifting in Southampton.

In the September 12 Republican primary, McFarland was defeated by Spencer, 61% to 39%, amid historically low turnout. Spencer went on to lose to Clinton in the general election.

=== Political commentator ===
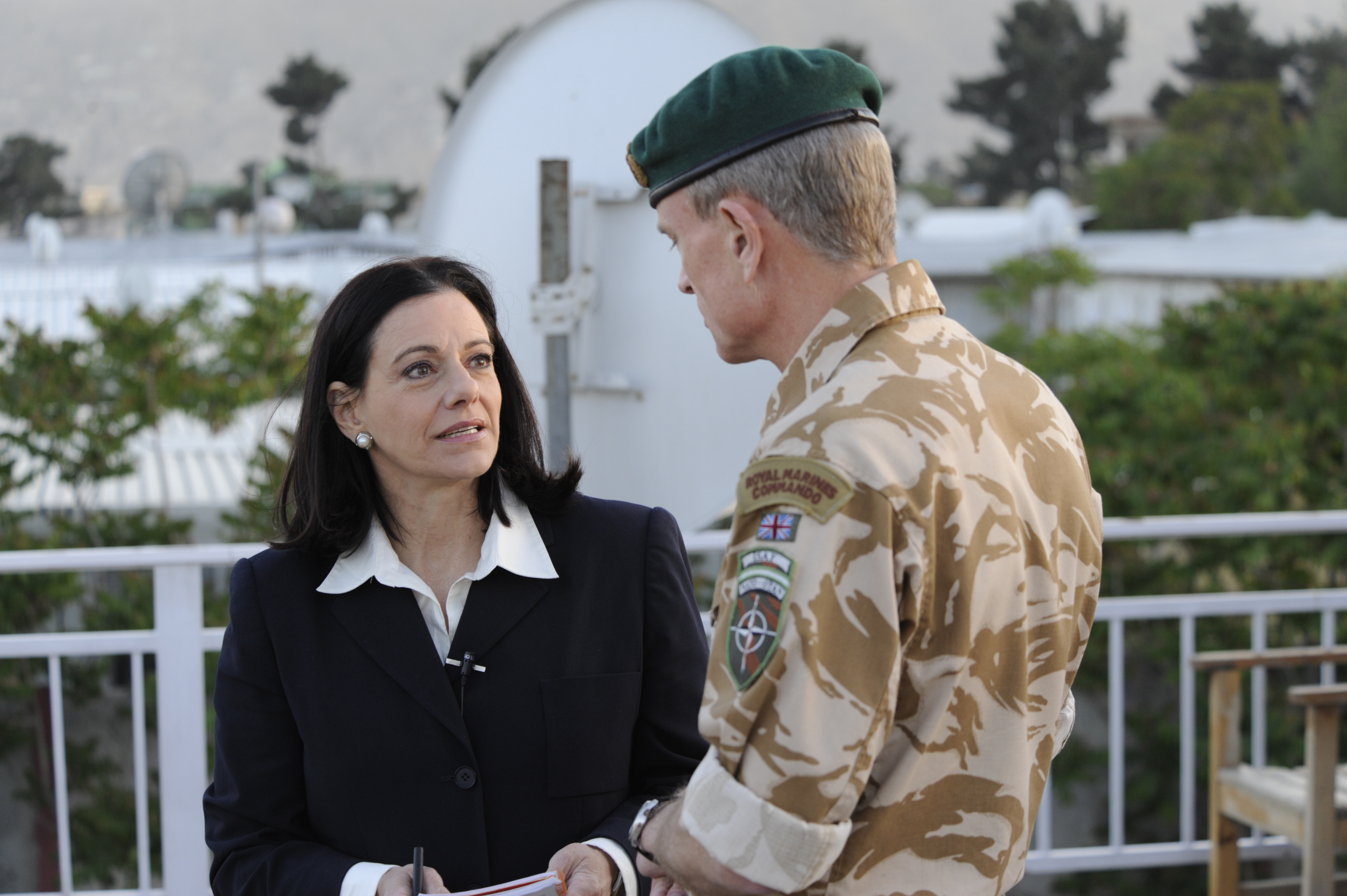
McFarland talking to British General James Dutton in 2009 in Afghanistan

In 2010, McFarland regularly appeared on Fox News as a commentator, wrote a weekly column on FoxNews.com, and hosted an online talk show called Defcon 3, a reference to DEFCON, the United States' defense readiness scale. She also appeared regularly on Fox News Radio, ABC Radio, WMAL, and WVOX.

In this role, McFarland was highly critical of President Obama's approach to combating terrorism, saying he failed to acknowledge the threat that "global Islamist jihad" posed to "Western Civilization". After the ISIL beheading incidents in 2014, she said Obama had "stuck his head in the sand" and said it was a "dereliction of duty" for Obama to play "a lot of golf".

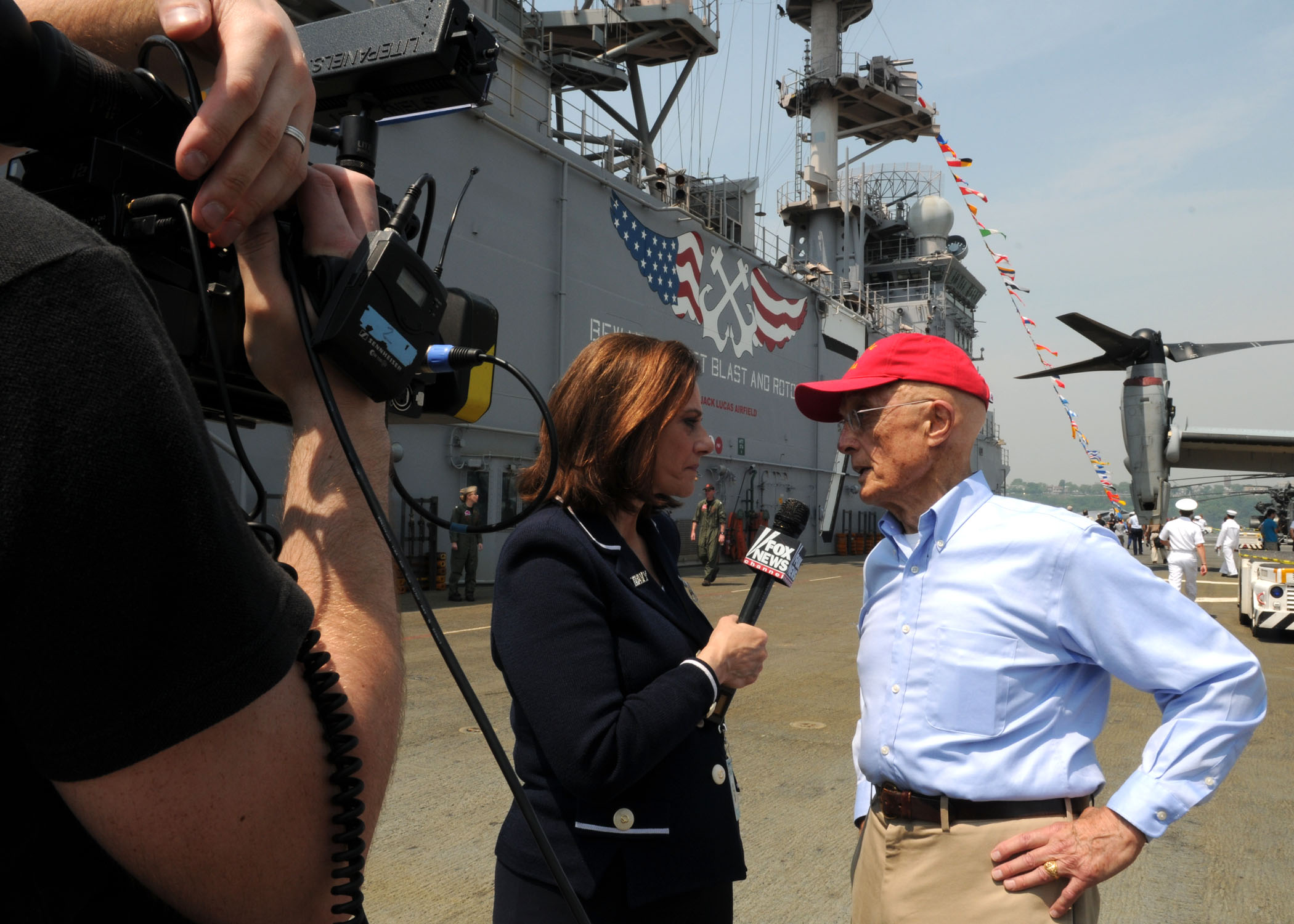
McFarland interviews World War II veteran Lou DiPaolo on the deck of the USS Iwo Jima in New York in 2011

On the U.S. diplomatic cables leak, McFarland called Julian Assange a terrorist, called WikiLeaks "a terrorist organization", and called for the death penalty for Chelsea Manning (whom she referred to as Bradley Manning) if the soldier was found guilty of making the leaks. On waterboarding, she said, "It's not torture, but even if it is torture, it's worth doing".

As a commentator, McFarland often expressed doubts about globalism and the value of U.S. interventions abroad. She disagreed with the 2011 military intervention in Libya, applauded the United Kingdom's Brexit vote to withdraw from the European Union, asserted that Iran should either be bombed or should be allowed to attain nuclear capability, and dismissed putative Saudi support for the Iranian nuclear agreement based on a negative view of the honesty and integrity of Arabs.

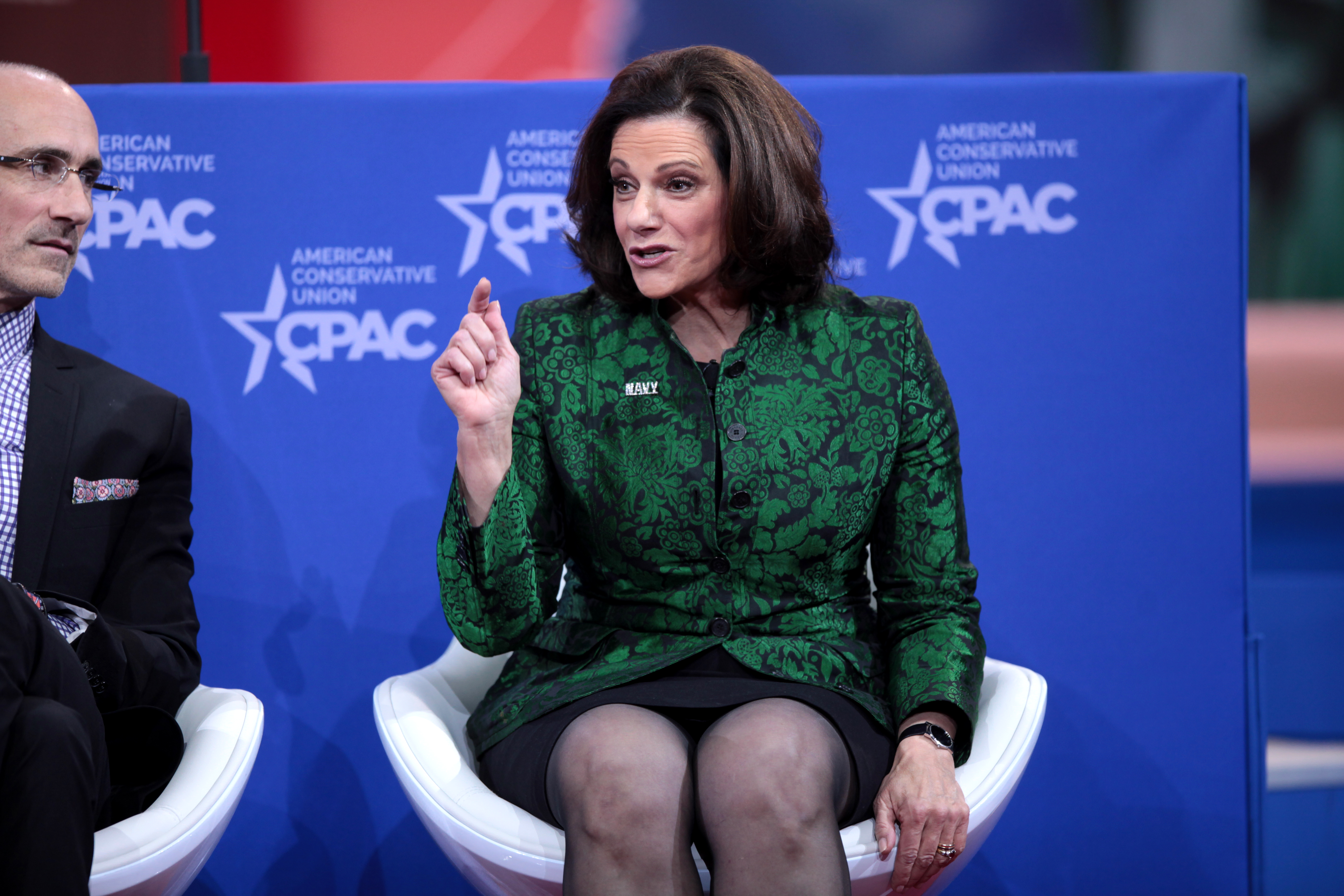
McFarland speaking at CPAC 2015

In 2013, McFarland wrote that Vladimir Putin deserved a Nobel Peace Prize for his actions during the Syrian Civil War. In 2014, following the annexation of Crimea, she tweeted, "Putin seizes countries, Obama threatens maybe to kick Russia out of the G-8 club. Bet Putin's sorry now! Winners write history, not whiners."

In April 2026, on Fox News, McFarland took a partisan stand and defended President Trump's threat to commit war crimes, stating that "We don't do that;" thus dismissing the claims of many objective experts on what constitutes a war crimes.

=== Other work ===
McFarland is the author of three books, Our Time is Now: Reclaiming an America We Can Believe In, Our Time is Now: Tough Love Diplomacy, Commonsense Economy, and the Second Great American Century, and Revolution: Trump, Washington and "We the People".

McFarland was a board member of The Jamestown Foundation from June 2008 until her appointment as Deputy National Security Advisor in 2017. She also served as a distinguished advisor to the Foundation for Defense of Democracies. McFarland is a life member of the Council on Foreign Relations.

=== Trump administration ===
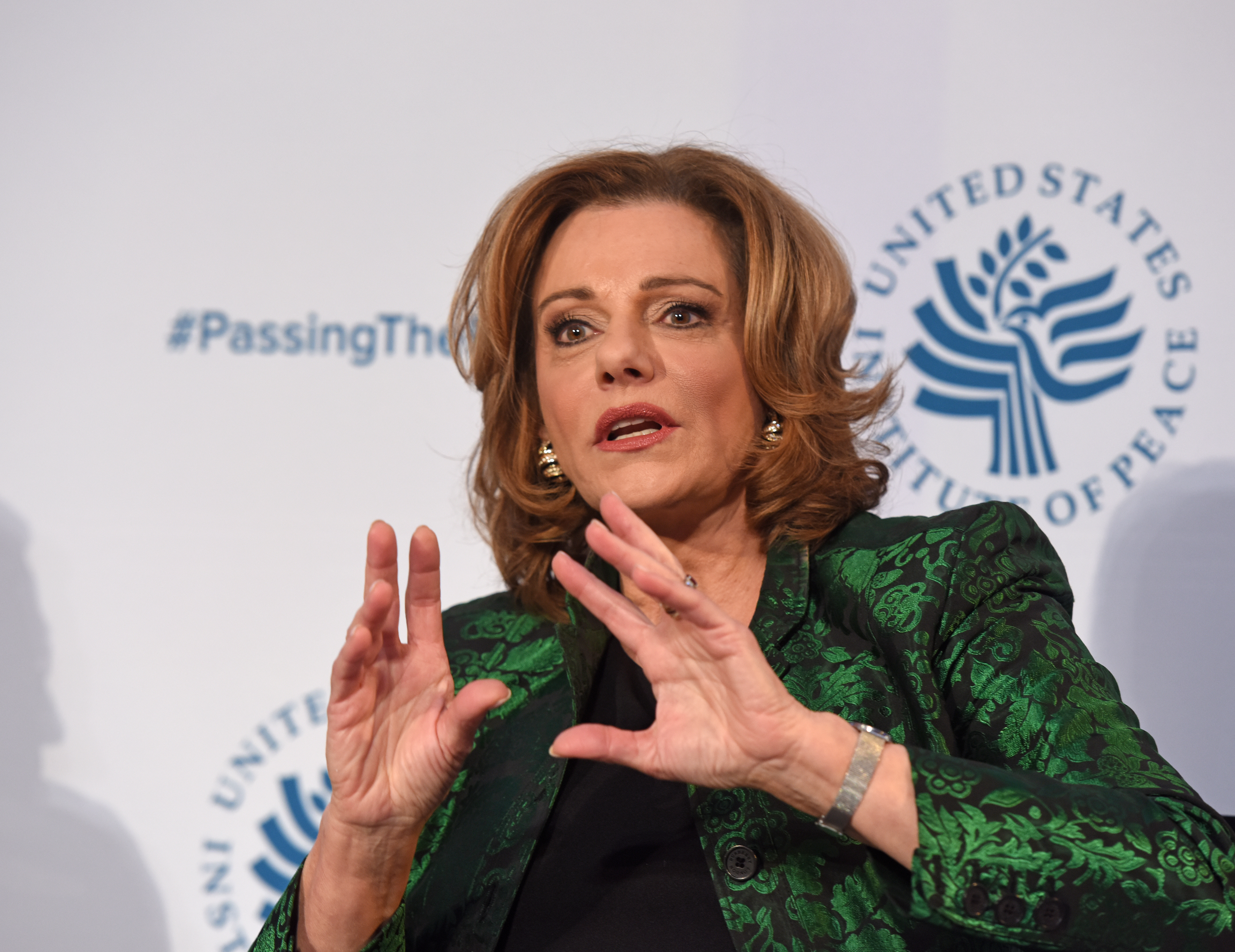
McFarland speaking at the United States Institute of Peace in January 2017

==== Deputy National Security Advisor ====
On November 25, 2016, the Washington Post reported that McFarland had been selected as President-elect Donald Trump's Deputy National Security Advisor, a position that does not require Senate confirmation. McFarland's former boss, Henry Kissinger, praised the selection. Retired general Michael T. Flynn, who had been selected as President Trump's national security adviser tweeted a welcome to her. Former U.S. Democratic Senator Joe Lieberman also praised McFarland for being "one of our country's most experienced, informed and wise foreign policy and national security experts".

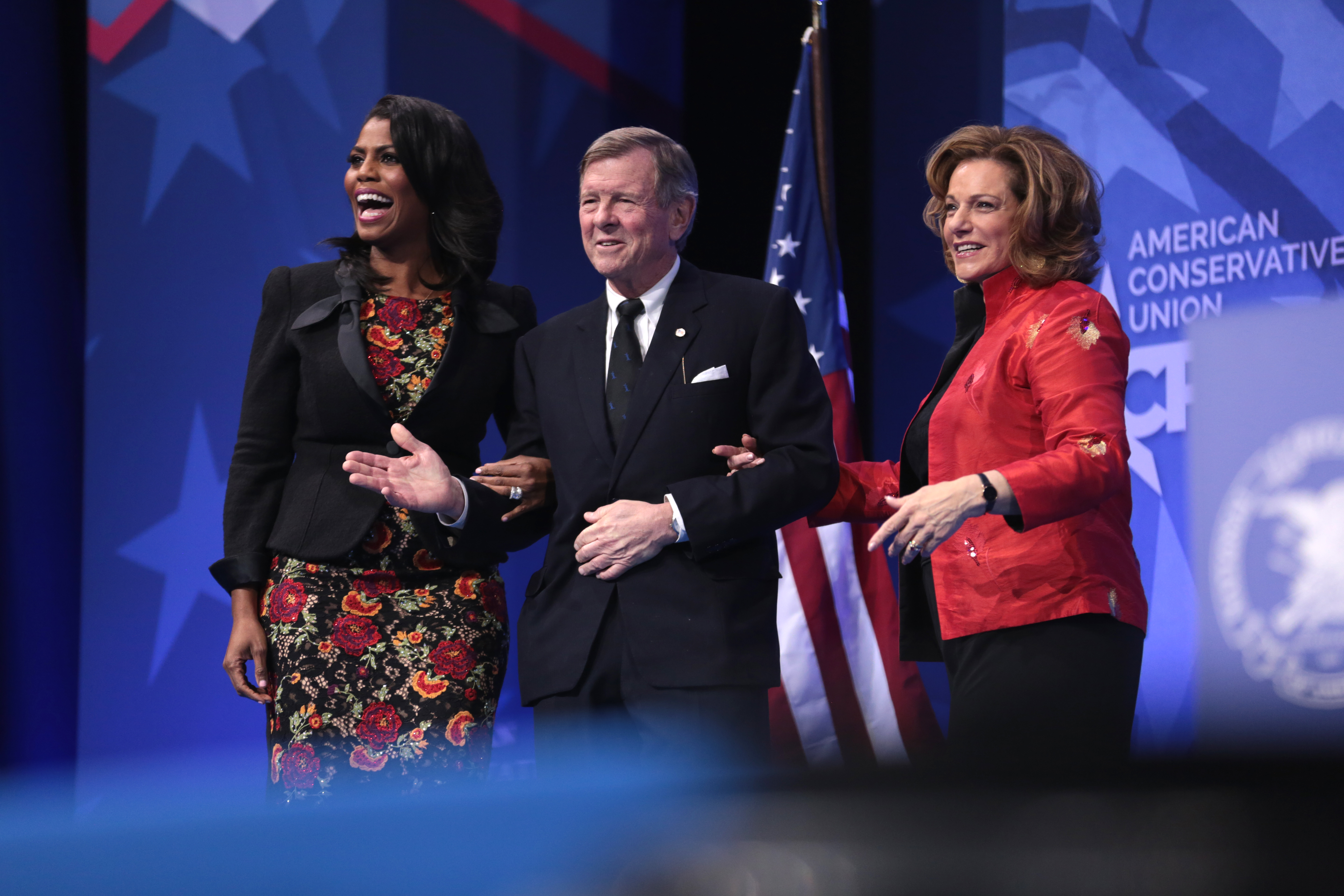
Deputy National Security Advisor McFarland at CPAC in February 2017, alongside her husband and Omarosa Manigault

On February 14, 2017, Flynn announced his resignation after he became embroiled in controversy regarding discussions he had with Russian officials. The Hill reported that McFarland remained on in her role at President Trump's request. Further reports indicated that a requirement for any replacement for Flynn was that McFarland be kept on as that person's number two; this was a disincentive for some potential nominees, including Vice Admiral Robert Harward. General H. R. McMaster was eventually named Flynn's replacement.

In mid-March 2017, Dina Habib Powell was named as another Deputy National Security Advisor, with an emphasis on strategy. According to Politico, the appointment had been "designed to effectively push out McFarland", who was "seen as a weak deputy".

On April 9, 2017, it was reported that McFarland had been asked to step down from her position but that she had been offered a position as the U.S. Ambassador to Singapore. Flynn's successor, H. R. McMaster, requested her resignation at the appointment of his own deputy. McFarland said she viewed the move as a "promotion".

==== Ambassadorial nomination and Special Counsel investigation ====
After Ricky L. Waddell was nominated to succeed McFarland as Deputy National Security Advisor on May 10, 2017, McFarland was officially announced as Trump's nominee for U.S. Ambassador to Singapore on May 19, 2017. On June 15, 2017, McFarland was formally nominated by the White House. Her confirmation hearing before the Senate Foreign Relations Committee took place on July 20, 2017. During the hearing, McFarland stated that she believed Russia had interfered in the 2016 U.S. elections. On September 19, McFarland's confirmation was approved by the committee and was sent on to the full Senate.

On December 1, Robert Mueller's Special Counsel investigation named McFarland as one of the people involved with Michael Flynn, her former supervisor, and Jared Kushner in developments leading up to Flynn's guilty plea for lying to the FBI. In particular, the investigation found that Kushner and McFarland had briefed Flynn on what to say about U S. sanctions against Russia. The next day, an email McFarland wrote during the transition surfaced; it read: "If there is a tit-for-tat escalation Trump will have difficulty improving relations with Russia, which has just thrown U.S.A. election to him." After talking to Kislyak, Flynn informed McFarland of the contents of the conversation; McFarland, in turn, passed on the information to one of her colleagues.

In response to these revelations, Senate Foreign Relations Committee ranking Democratic members Mark Warner and Dianne Feinstein suggested that McFarland testify before Congress, Sen. Cory Booker questioned whether McFarland had been fully forthcoming in her previous testimony, and Committee Chair Bob Corker pronounced her nomination "frozen". By December 5, committee Democrats had placed a formal Senate hold on her nomination.

At the end of 2017, the U.S. Senate sent McFarland's nomination back to the White House rather than tabling it until 2018, along with other pending nominations. On January 10, 2018, the administration renominated McFarland. On February 2, 2018, McFarland withdrew her nomination due to concerns about her answers to questions related to links between Trump associates and Russian officials. At the withdrawal of her nomination, President Trump said in a statement, “unfortunately, some Democrats chose to play politics rather than move forward with a qualified nominee for a critically important post."

In September 2018, it became known that McFarland had indeed walked back her story to the special prosecutor. The FBI accepted McFarland's contention that she had not intentionally misstated facts.

== Awards and honors ==
In 1985, McFarland received the Department of Defense's highest civilian honor, the Distinguished Civilian Service Award.

== Personal life ==
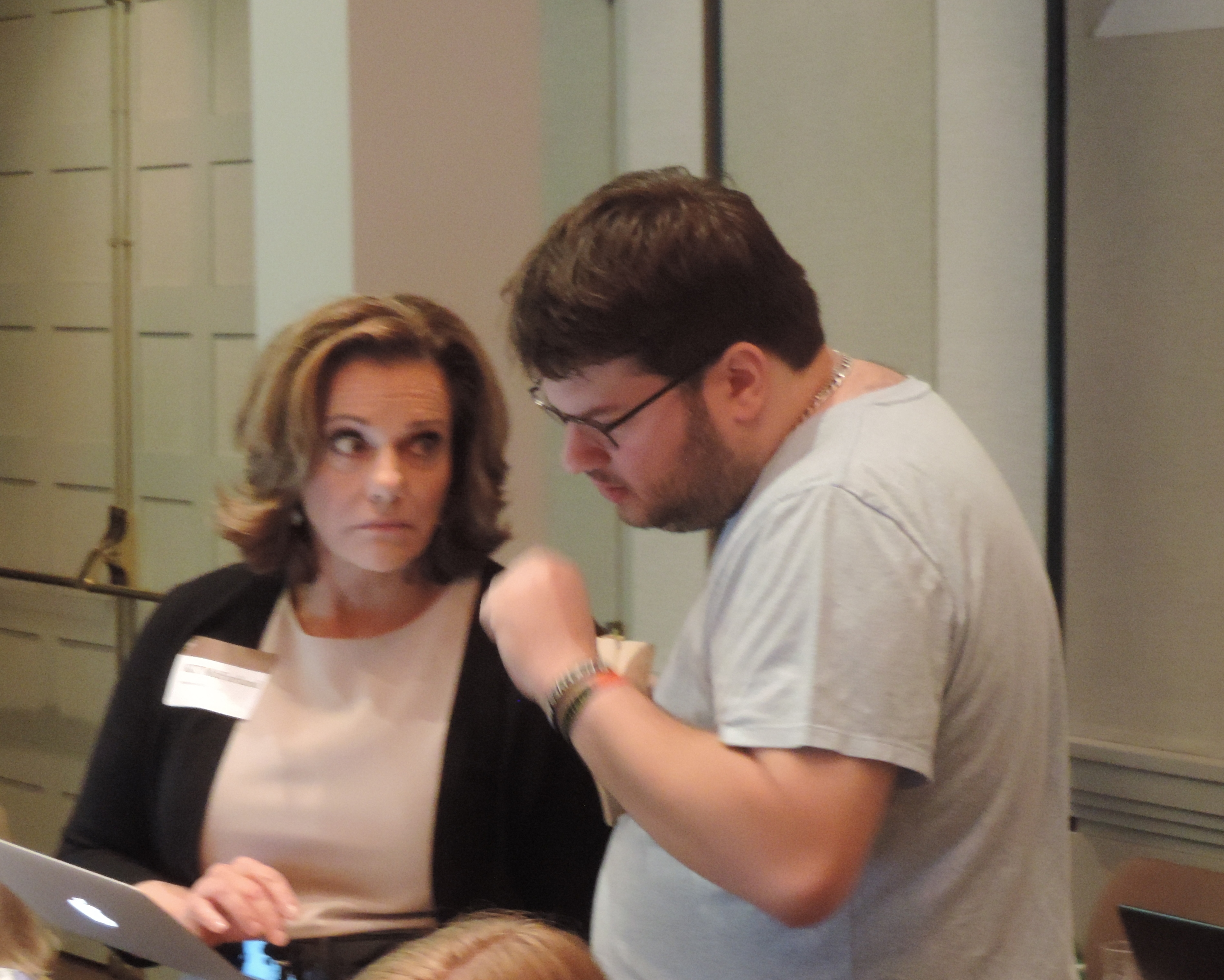
McFarland assisting at a 2016 edit-a-thon at the Council on Foreign Relations on foreign policy

Troia married Alan Roberts McFarland on January 12, 1985, at the National Cathedral in Washington, D.C. After getting married, Troia was known as K.T. McFarland. Alan McFarland worked as a general partner in Lazard Frères and went on to become a well-known investment banker. The couple had three children together, and K.T. McFarland became a stepmother to her husband's two children from his first marriage. Her oldest daughter, Fiona McFarland, attended the United States Naval Academy.
