= Mayor of Yonkers =

- Seal of the City of Yonkers

- Flag of the City of Yonkers

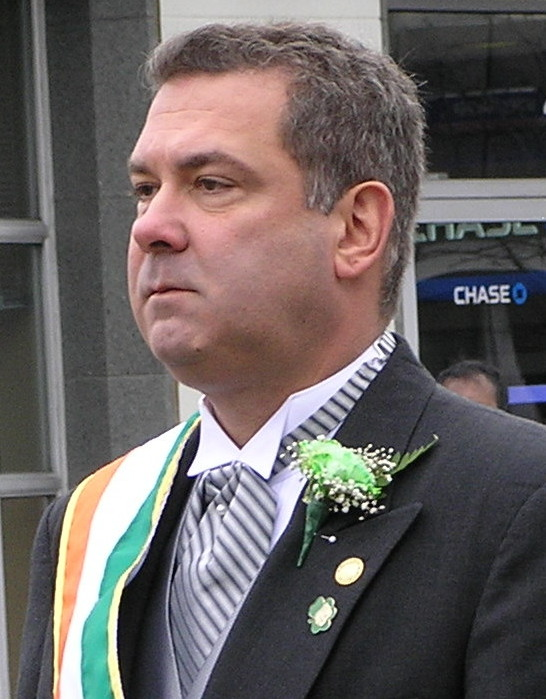
- Incumbent; Mike Spano since January 1, 2012
- Style: The Honorable
- Term length: 4 years, Renewable
- Inaugural holder: Norton P. Otis
- Formation: 1880
- Salary: $228,000 (2025)
- Website: www.yonkersny.gov

The Mayor of Yonkers is the official head and chief executive officer of the city of Yonkers, New York, United States.

== List of mayors of Yonkers ==
- Mike Spano (2012–present)
- Phil Amicone (2004–2011)
- John Spencer (1996–2003)
- Terence M. Zaleski (1992–1995)
- Henry Spallone (1990–91)
- Nick Wasicsko (1988–1989)
- Angelo R. Martinelli (1982–1987)
- Gerry Loehr (1980–81)
- Angelo R. Martinelli (1974–1979)
- Alfred DelBello (1970–1973)
- Dr. James Francis Xavier O’Rourke (1966–1969)
- John E. Flynn (1962–1965)
- Kristen Kristensen (1950–1961)
- Edith P. Welty (1949)
- Curtiss E. Frank (1944–1949)
- Joseph F. Loehr (1930s)
- William A Walsh, Sr. (1925–1927)
- James T. Lennon (1910–1918)
- Nathan A. Warren (1907–1909)
- John H. Coyne (1905–1907)
- John Emory Andrus (1903–1905)
- Michael J. Walsh (1901–1903)
- Leslie M. Sutherland (1897–1901)
- John G. Peene (1894–1897)
- James H. Weller (1892–1894)
- James Millward (1890–1892)
- J. Harvey Bell (1886–1890)
- William G. Stahlnecker (1884–1886)
- Samuel G. Swift (1882–1884)
- Norton P. Otis (1880–1882)

== In popular culture ==
- The 1999 book and 2015 miniseries Show Me a Hero detail a white middle-class neighborhood's resistance to a federally mandated scattered-site public housing development in Yonkers.
