= The Wild Pair (film) =

- Directed by: Beau Bridges
- Written by: Joseph Gunn
- Story by: Joseph Gunn; John Crowther
- Produced by: Paul Mason
- Starring: Beau Bridges; Bubba Smith; Lloyd Bridges
- Cinematography: Peter Stein
- Edited by: Scott Conrad; Christopher Holmes; Frank Sacco
- Music by: John Debney; Michel Colombier
- Distributed by: Trans World Entertainment
- Release date: December 11, 1987 (New York City)
- Running time: 88 minutes
- Country: United States
- Language: English

The Wild Pair is a 1987 action comedy film directed by Beau Bridges and starring Bridges, Bubba Smith and Lloyd Bridges.

== Plot ==
Detective Sgt. Ben “Benny” Avalon (Bubba Smith) is a tough but good-natured cop who is well-known around his inner city neighborhood and an active mentor to youth while off-duty. Avalon is unmarried but has a cat named Beatrice, and a pretty downstairs neighbor named Debby (Lela Rochon).

One night while Avalon plays basketball at a neighborhood gym, a team of commandos murder two teens and set an adjacent building on fire with explosives. The commandos then proceed to shoot at people evacuating the burning building while the team's commander, "Colonel" Hester (Lloyd Bridges), watches from a darkened Cadillac. Avalon is personally acquainted with several victims, including a local girl as well as a low level drug dealer.

A man later revealed to be FBI Special Agent Joe Jennings (Beau Bridges) is seated at a topless bar, looking for “big action.” A dancer sits down at his table, and begins to refer Jennings to an established drug dealer named Ivory Jones (Raymond St. Jacques) but Avalon enters the bar and the dancer leaves. Avalon and Jennings scuffle, which triggers a barroom brawl. Avalon chases a bar patron outside, followed by Jennings. Jennings tries to arrest Avalon, who identifies himself as a police officer.

Avalon and Jennings are paired by Avalon’s Captain Kramer (Gary Lockwood) as reluctant partners in order to infiltrate Jones' criminal organization. Jennings objects but the FBI confirms the assignment, much to Jennings’ dismay. Avalon and Jennings slowly build a rapport, later foiling a chance robbery attempt at a supermarket where Avalon is shopping, but distrust remains.

The commandos are revealed to be part of The Sentinel, a revolutionary, white supremacist militia under the leadership of Hester, a retired military officer who himself lost a son in combat and who is dedicated to “finishing the fight" against what he believes to be nefarious non-white influencers funded by Jewish backers. Hester has a young son named William (Dylan Bridges), whom he calls Billy Boy. He wants to reshape the country for his son based on his racist principles, and plans to use guerrilla combatants training at the Sentinel compound, with funding from illegal narcotics sales.

Jennings has been conducting surveillance on some of Hester's associates. Avalon, sensing that Jennings has not been completely forthcoming, disables Jennings’ car, preventing him from working alone. After Jennings sneaks away, Avalon survives an attempt on his life, subduing both assailants and then accusing Jennings of having him ambushed. Jennings denies responsibility, and the pair reconcile in order to focus their efforts on Jones.

Avalon raids an illegal casino/massage parlor in an old firehouse, where he chases and confronts criminal-turned-informant Tucker (Danny De La Paz), cornering him in a dumbwaiter. Tucker sets Jennings up for an undercover drug buy from Jones. Jennings is skeptical of the meet-up, while Avalon remains unsure of Jennings' intentions. Following a preliminary meeting in an abandoned building, Jennings brings a briefcase to the deal location, but surprises Jones and his men and steals the drugs. Jones warns Jennings that the drugs belong to The Sentinel but Jennings scoffs before speeding away. Avalon confronts Jennings about the subterfuge, and demands to know everything. Jennings informs Avalon about Hester and The Sentinel, whom the FBI has been investigating and whose recruits include cops from Avalon’s own precinct. It is then revealed that Captain Kramer is working for Hester, and that the pairing of Avalon and Jennings was deliberate.

Avalon introduces Jennings to his friend Fern Willis (Ellen Geer) at a restaurant where they are joined by Debby, but the group's meal is interrupted by gunfire from masked men with automatic weapons outside. Tucker is revealed to have been killed, presumably for his part in the crooked meet-up between Jennings and Jones. Jennings and Avalon split up and manage to shoot some of the attackers, while Debby and Fern escape. Avalon commandeers a pizza delivery motorcycle, instructing the owner to call the police, before taking off after some of the attackers. Avalon shoots at the vehicle, causing it to roll over and explode. Avalon returns the badly damaged motorcycle to its owner, suggesting that the bill be sent to the FBI.

Jennings separately chases a van driven by another of the attackers. The van pursued by Jennings eventually crashes, but Jennings is abducted by Sentinel goons dressed as police officers responding to the scene. Avalon realizes that Jennings has been taken hostage, and drives home where he confronts two Sentinel soldiers in Debby’s apartment before heading upstairs to his own apartment. Fern sits dead on Avalon’s sofa, and Debby is found slain in his bathtub. Beatrice is also dead; Avalon vows revenge.

Kramer returns to his precinct office, where Avalon is waiting. Kramer falsely suggests that the FBI has recalled Jennings. Avalon confronts Kramer with evidence of Kramer’s involvement. Kramer implicates Hester in the master scheme. Kramer first denies knowing where Jennings is being held, before giving up the location of the Sentinel compound. Avalon breaks Kramer’s neck, killing him.

A defiant Jennings is being interrogated and tortured at Hester’s direction. As Jones is about to collect 40 kg of heroin from Hester, a heavily armed Avalon breaks into the Sentinel camp, detonates explosives, and frees Jennings. Avalon and Jennings engage Hester’s men, managing to kill several. An armored limousine carrying Jones is diverted by Jennings and destroyed by Avalon using a Sentinel tank, killing Jones and his men. Hester tries to flee but is confronted at his desk by Avalon. Hester wounds Avalon with several high-tech weapons amassed by the Sentinel, before attacking with a medieval ball and chain. Avalon fatally stabs Hester as police sirens approach.

Back in the neighborhood gym, a recovering Avalon is playing basketball with children when Jennings visits to bid farewell to Avalon before leaving for a vacation. Jennings gifts Avalon with a kitten named Joe and leaves, but not before sticking Avalon with the repair bill for the pizza delivery motorcycle.

== Cast ==
- Beau Bridges as Joe Jennings
- Bubba Smith as Benny Avalon
- Lloyd Bridges as Col. Hester
- Gary Lockwood as Capt. Kramer
- Raymond St. Jacques as Ivory
- Danny De La Paz as Tucker
- Lela Rochon as Debby
- Ellen Geer as Fern Willis

== Reception ==
Leonard Maltin awarded the film one and a half stars.
