= Lawrence Downes =

American journalist

- Occupation: journalist
- Notable credit: The New York Times

Lawrence Downes is an American journalist and member of the editorial board of The New York Times since 2004.

== Education ==
Downes obtained his B.A. degree in English from Fordham University in 1986. From 1987 to 1989, he attended the University of Missouri School of Journalism.

== Career ==
Downes has worked for The New York Times since 1993. During the 2000 presidential election, he worked on the National desk as enterprise editor and as deputy political editor. From 1998 to 2000, Downes worked as a weekend editor on the Metro desk. Prior to working this position, he was the deputy weekend editor and copy editor. From 1992 to 1993, he was a copy editor at Newsday and from 1989 to 1992 at the Chicago Sun-Times.

On August 9, 2020, Downes advocated purchasing from public libraries books by conservative authors such as Sean Hannity in order to prevent others from reading them. He further suggested composting the books for worm food.
