= Yonkers City Council =

Municipal government in New York

History
- New session started: January 1, 2024

Leadership
- City Council President: Lakisha Collins-Bellamy (D) since January 1, 2022
- Majority Leader: John Rubbo (D) since January 1, 2024
- Minority Leader: Michael B. Breen (R) since January 1, 2018

Structure
- Seats: 7
- Political groups: Majority caucus: Democratic (6); Minority caucus: Republican (1)
- Length of term: 4 years
- Salary: $60,000/year.

Elections
- Last election: November 4, 2025 (4 seats)
- Next election: November 4, 2027 (3 seats)

The Yonkers City Council is the legislative branch of the city of Yonkers, New York. and uses a strong Mayor-Council government. The city elects six councilmen, each serving four- year terms, and an at-large member who is called the City Council president, all serving for four years at a time and subject to a four-term limit. Regular meetings are held every Tuesday of the month, with extra meetings to be held other days, if planned.

Yonkers is largest city in Westchester County, New York, and is the third-largest in the state.

== City Council ==
Current seats
Position/District	Name	Party	Last elected
City Council President	Lakisha Collins-Bellamy	Democratic	2025
Majority Whip/1st District	Deana R. Robinson	Democratic	2023
2nd District	Corazon Pineda-Isaac	Democratic	2025
3rd District	Tasha Diaz	Democratic	2023
Majority Leader/4th District	John Rubbo	Democratic (Note: Originally elected as a Republican. Re-elected as a Democrat.)	2025
Minority Leader/5th District	Michael B. Breen	Republican	2023
6th District	Timothy J. Hodges	Democratic	2025

=== Committees ===
Each committee reviews legislative portfolios before items are brought to a full vote before the council meetings. For the 2026–27 term, the committees include:

- Rules
- Budget and Finance
- Environmental Policy and Protection
- Real Estate
- Education
- Intergovernmental Affairs
- Municipal Operations and Public Safety
- Community and Mental Health Services
- Legislation and Codes

=== Legislation and budgeting ===
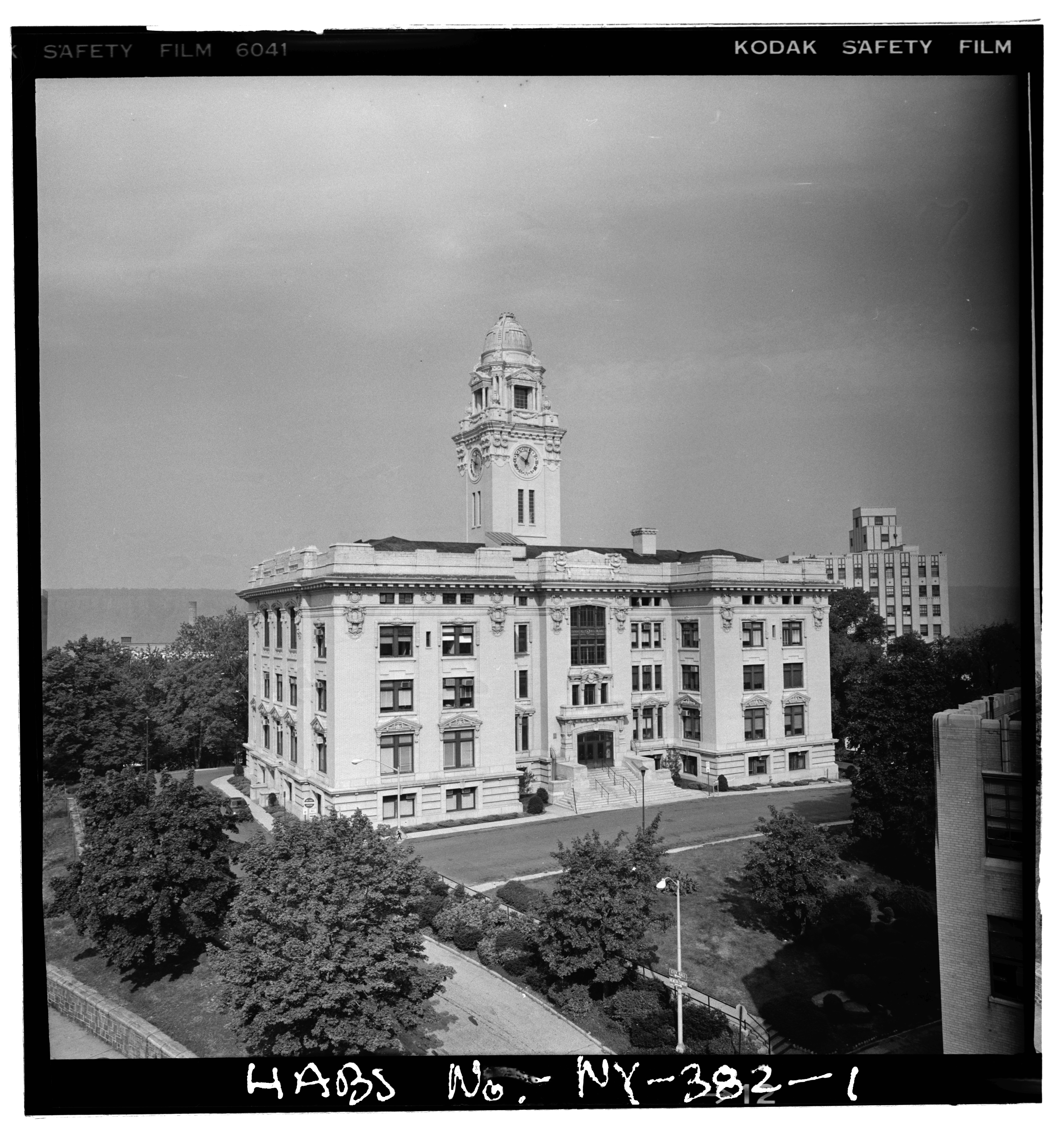
City Hall

On May 27, 2026, the Yonkers City Council voted unanimously to rename the intersection of School Street and Brook Street as "Earl DMX Simmons Way." The intersection is near the Calcagno Homes public housing complex on School Street, where DMX was raised. The designation was described as a way to establish his connection to Yonkers as part of the official public record. A renaming ceremony was held, attended by Yonkers Mayor Mike Spano, local officials, the Ruff Ryders family, and others.

On May 29, 2026, the City Council unanimously adopted a $1.64 billion municipal budget for the 2026–27 fiscal year. The fiscal package lowered a proposed 5.25% tax hike down to a 4.75% property tax rate increase through the integration of state-level funding support. The budget directed $56.3 million in structural adjustments to Yonkers Public Schools, earmarking specific allocations for textbook acquisition, localized Wi-Fi upgrades, and student device updates.
