= Public-order crime =

Type of crime; running contrary to social order

In criminology, public-order crime is defined by Siegel (2004) as "crime which involves acts that interfere with the operations of society and the ability of people to function efficiently", i.e., it is behaviour that has been labelled criminal because it is contrary to shared norms, social values, and customs. Robertson (1989:123) maintains a crime is nothing more than "an act that contravenes a law". Generally speaking, deviancy is criminalized when it is too disruptive and has proved uncontrollable through informal sanctions.

Public-order crime should be distinguished from political crime. In the former, although the identity of the "victim" may be indirect and sometimes diffuse, it is cumulatively the community that suffers, whereas in a political crime, the state perceives itself to be the victim and criminalizes the behaviour it considers threatening. Thus, public-order crime includes consensual crime and victimless crime. It asserts the need to use the law to maintain order both in the legal and moral sense. Public-order crime is now the preferred term by proponents as against the use of the word "victimless" based on the idea that there are secondary victims (family, friends, acquaintances, and society at large) that can be identified.

For example, in cases where a criminal act subverts or undermines the commercial effectiveness of normative business practices, the negative consequences extend beyond those at whom the specific immediate harm was intended. Similarly, in environmental law, there are offences that do not have a direct, immediate, and tangible victim, so crimes go largely unreported and unprosecuted because of the problem of lack of victim awareness. In short, there are no clear, unequivocal definitions of "consensus", "harm", "injury", "offender", and "victim". Such judgments are always informed by contestable, epistemological, moral, and political assumptions (de Haan, 1990: 154).

A vice squad is a police division whose focus is stopping public-order crimes like gambling, narcotics, prostitution, and illegal sales of alcohol.

== England and Wales ==
Note that under English and Welsh law, a "public-order offence" is a different category of crime related to disorderly conduct and other breaches of the peace.

== Crimes without apparent victims ==
In public-order crimes, there are many instances of criminality where a person is accused because he/she has made a personal choice to engage in an activity of which society disapproves, e.g., private recreational drug use. Thus, there is continuing political debate on criminalization versus decriminalization, focusing on whether it is appropriate to use punishment to enforce the various public policies that regulate the nominated behaviours. After all, society could deal with unpopular behaviour without invoking criminal or other legal processes.

Following the work of Schur (1965), these types of crime usually include the sexually based offences of prostitution, paraphilia (i.e., sexual practices considered deviant), underage sex, and pornography. They also include the offences involving substance abuse which may or may not involve some element of public disorder or danger to the public, as in driving while intoxicated. Since 1965, however, societal views have changed greatly. For example, prostitution, often considered a victimless crime, is classified by some countries as a form of exploitation of women; such views are held in Sweden, Norway, and Iceland, where it is illegal to pay for sex, but not to be a prostitute (the client commits a crime, but not the prostitute), see Prostitution in Sweden.

When deciding whether harm to innocent individuals should be prohibited, the moral and political beliefs held by those in power interact and inform the decisions to create or repeal crimes without apparent victims. These decisions change over time as moral standards change. For example, Margaret Sanger who founded the first birth-control clinic in New York City was accused of distributing obscene material and violating public morals. Information about birth control is no longer considered obscene (see the U.S. case law examples). Within the context of a discussion on whether governments should regulate public morals in the interest of the public good, Meier & Geis (1997) identify which social problems might be deemed appropriate for legal intervention and the extent to which the criminal law should enforce moral positions which may lack societal consensus.

This reflects a more fundamental problem of legal consistency. Jurisdictions may recognize a personal right to engage in some self-destructive activities. For all its carcinogenic qualities, tobacco is not a prohibited substance. Similarly, the excessive consumption of alcohol can have severe physical consequences, but it is not a crime to consume it. This is matched in gambling. The state and its institutions often rely on lotteries, raffles, and other legal forms of gambling for operating funds, whether directly or indirectly through the taxation of profits from casinos and other licensed outlets. Qualitatively, there is nothing to distinguish the forms of gambling deemed illegal. A side effect of turning too many people into criminals is that the concept of crime becomes blurred and genuine criminality becomes less unacceptable. If the key distinction between real crime and moral regulation is not made clearly, as more consensual activities become crimes, ordinary citizens are criminalized for tax-evasion, illegal downloading, and other voluntary rule-breaking. A further perceptual problem emerges when laws remain in force but are obviously not enforced, i.e. the police reflect the consensus view that the activity should not be a crime. Alternatively, if the activities prohibited are consensual and committed in private, this offers incentives to the organizers to offer bribes in exchange for diverting enforcement resources or to overlooking discovered activity, thereby encouraging political and police corruption. Thus, any deterrent message that the state might wish to send is distorted or lost.

More generally, political parties find it easier to talk dismissively about crimes if they are classified as victimless because their abolition or amendment looks to have fewer economic and political costs, i.e., the use of the word "victimless" implies that there are no injuries caused by these crimes (Robertson 1989:125) and, if that is true, then there is no need to create or retain the criminal offences. This may reflect a limited form of reality that, in the so-called "victimless crimes", there are no immediate victims to make police reports and those who engage in the given behaviour regard the law as inappropriate, not themselves. This has two consequences:

- Because these crimes often take place in private, comprehensive law enforcement (often including entrapment and the use of agent provocateurs) would consume an enormous amount of resources. It is therefore convenient for the law enforcement agencies to classify a crime as victimless because that is used as a justification for devoting fewer resources as against crimes where there are "real" victims to protect; and
- These crimes usually involve something desirable where large profits can be made, e.g., drugs or sex.

== The hidden crime factor ==
Because most of these crimes take place in private or with some degree of secrecy, it is difficult to establish the true extent of the crime. The "victims" are not going to report it and arrest statistics are unreliable indicators of prevalence, often varying in line with local political pressure to "do something" about a local problem rather than reflecting the true incidence of criminal activity. In addition to the issue of police resources and commitment, many aspects of these activities are controlled by organized crime and are therefore more likely to remain hidden. These factors are used to argue for decriminalization. Low or falling arrest statistics are used to assert that the incidence of the relevant crimes is low or now under control. Alternatively, keeping some of these "vices" as crimes simply keeps organized crime in business.

== Decriminalization of public-order crimes ==
Maguire and Radosh (1999: 146/7) accept that the public-order crimes that cause the most controversy are directly related to the current perceptions of morality. The most fundamental question remains whether the government has the right to enforce laws prohibiting private behaviour.

=== Arguments in favor of decriminalization ===
Those who favor decriminalization or legalization contend that government should be concerned with matters affecting the common good, and not seek to regulate morality at an individual level. Indeed, the fact that the majority ignore many of the laws, say on drug-taking, in countries founded on democratic principles should encourage the governments elected by those majorities to repeal the laws. Failure to do so simply undermines respect for all laws, including those laws that should, and, indeed, must be followed. Indeed, when considering the range of activities prohibited, the practical policing of all these crimes would require the creation of a police state intruding into every aspect of the peoples' lives, no matter how private. It is unlikely that this application of power would be accepted even if history showed such high-profile enforcement to be effective. Prohibition arguably did not prevent the consumption of alcohol, and the present war on drugs is expensive and ineffective. Those who favor decriminalization also point to experience in those countries which permit activities such as recreational drug use. There is clear evidence of lower levels of substance abuse and disruptive behavior.

1. The presence of public-order crimes encourages a climate of general disrespect for the law. Many individuals choose to violate public-order laws, because they are easily violable, and there is no victim to complain. This encourages disrespect for the law, including disrespect for laws involving crimes with victims.
2. To criminalize behavior that harms no other or society violates individual freedom and the human/natural rights of the individual. The right of the individual to do what they will, so long as they harm no other, or society as a whole, is a generally accepted principle within free and democratic societies; criminalization of acts that others feel are immoral, but are not clearly proven to be harmful, is generally violative of that principle; although exceptions may—and do—apply. (For example, the simple possession of child pornography or engaging in animal cruelty is criminal, in most civilized nations; however, there is no direct victim (except the animal, whose rights are not cognizable by law); the reason for its criminalization is the "bad tendency" of these acts; persons who derive pleasure from acts such as these often have depraved desires—it can be inferred that people who abuse animals, rarely stop there—and that people who possess child pornography will seek more than just mere depictions.) There are questions of the victimlessness of such supposed "exception" crimes as well as criticisms of the validity of assuming "bad tendencies" though. One example of criticism of the idea of criminalizing cruelty to animals out of a bad tendency in the people who do it instead of animal suffering is that research on the ability of animals to suffer by studies of animal brains is often used to determine what animals should be covered by laws against cruelty to animals, as shown in controversies about extending such laws to fish and invertebrates in which animal brain studies (not forensic psychiatry on humans) are the main cited arguments both for and against criminalization. It is also pointed out that computer games with "cruelty" to virtual mammals are legal in most Western countries while cruelty to real mammals is not, again showing that it is inner animal suffering and not outer body language that is relevant regardless of whether or not animals are formally classified as victims in courts. The notion of cruelty to animals as a predictor of violence to other humans is also criticized for lacking consistency with the evolutionary notion of empathy being gradually extended from close relatives to more distant relatives according to which cruelty to other humans should predict cruelty to animals but not the other way, explaining the appearance of cruelty to animals being a risk factor for violence to humans as a result of criminal investigation spending more resources investigating people known to abuse animals for human violence while people with no history of animal abuse or animal neglect more easily get away with violence to other humans due to being less investigated. In the case of child pornography depicting real children (not cartoons), victimlessness is questioned as circulation of pornographic images of people taken when they were too young to consent to it may injure their personal integrity. In the case of cartoons, it is pointed out that the same psychiatrists who argued for criminalization (which in most countries where it is present happened later than criminalization of pornography with real children suggesting that it was not for the same reasons) have used the same arguments to acquit or strongly reduce sentences for statutory rape in cases where they deemed the victim to "look older", which critics cite as an example of it being counterproductive to protecting children, arguing that a societal transition from visual age guessing to ID checking would reduce statutory rape. There are other arguments than depravity to ban pornographic cartoons depicting minors however, including curtailment of profit from such cartoons which explains why such laws in some European countries have exceptions for cases when the creator and the possessor are the same person in which no transaction is involved. It is also argued that passive marijuana smoking de facto constitutes victimization in some cases of drug use. More generally it is argued that civilized punishment should be based on deterrence, while basing punishment on assumptions of depravity leads to inhumane and uncivilized punishment as the assumption that some people are inherently bad leads to an appearance of persecution being "necessary". It is also argued that since higher priorities of criminal investigation of people considered depraved can find statistical correlations by higher percentages of criminals in profiled groups being caught compared to non-profiled groups no matter if there is a link or not as a self-fulfilling prophecy, preventing it from being self-correcting and making it possible for depravity arguments to lead to anyone being classified as depraved and, as a result, a general loss of freedom. It is therefore argued that depravity arguments should be categorically avoided, as any "exception" would be a mobile goal post.
3. The cost of enforcing public-order crimes is too high to individual and societal freedom, and will inevitably result in coercion, force, brutality, usurpation of the democratic process, the development of a carceral state, and finally, tyranny. Due to public-order crimes not having a victim, someone aside from a victim has to be used to report public-order crimes, and someone other than the sovereign people itself has to be delegated to enforce the public-order laws (for examples of direct popular enforcement of laws, see hue and cry, posse comitatus, and the last vestige of democratic law enforcement today, the jury). This results in the development of an apparatus of coercion, a class of "law enforcers" within society, but separate from society, in that they are tasked with enforcing laws upon the people, rather than the people enforcing their own law. This inevitably results in violations of individual freedom, as this class of "law enforcers" seeks more and more power, and turns to more and more coercive means.
4. Public-order crimes often pertain to behavior engaged in especially by discernible classes of individuals within society (racial minorities, women, youth, poor people), and result in the criminalization or stigmatization of those classes, as well as resentment from those classes against the laws, against the government, or against society.
5. Public-order crimes will end up being selectively prosecuted, since it is not possible to prosecute them all. This creates or reinforces class, gender, or race based criminalization or stigmatization. It also is a very powerful tool for political persecution and suppression of dissent (see Selective enforcement). It produces a situation in which otherwise upstanding citizens are committing "crimes" but in the absence of mens rea (guilty mind) and without even being aware of the fact that their behavior is or was illegal until it becomes convenient to the state to prosecute them for it.
6. The natural variation in internal moral compass, which often turns out to be beneficial to society, or to stem from variations of understanding which will always be with us to some degree, leads to individuals committing "crimes" in the absence of mens rea. Individuals of all political stripes and background who do not have an encyclopedic knowledge of the law are vulnerable to accidentally committing crimes and suffering punishment when they were not aware that the behavior was even considered problematic. For instance individuals who violate building or zoning codes on their own property may be stuck with large expenses, life disruptions, or fines unexpectedly.
7. Public enforcement of morality will inevitably lead to individuals with underdeveloped moral compasses of their own, instead resulting in external restraint substituting for internal restraint, and, thus, greater immorality, deviance, and societal decadence. Or, they may give up on their internal compass and turn to a more Machiavellian approach if they are punished for following it.

=== Arguments against decriminalization ===
Those who oppose decriminalization believe that the morality of individuals collectively affects the good of the society and, without enforcement, the society will be damaged and lead to decadence. They believe that law shapes morality and builds a national character. If laws are not enforced, that is not the fault of the law. If people knew that they were likely to be arrested, they would modify their behavior. That current laws criminalizing theft do not deter thieves is not an argument for decriminalizing theft. Rather it is an argument in favor of devoting more resources into enforcement so that there is greater certainty of arrest and punishment. Thus, in public-order crimes, it is simply a lack of priority in current enforcement strategies that encourages such widespread public disobedience which, in all likelihood, would increase if the behavior was to be decriminalized.

== Specific examples ==
Meier and Geis (1997) contrast the view that prostitution and drug offenses are crimes without victims, with the view that the participants involved are victims without crimes. The use of the term "public-order crime" grew out of the research to test the hypothesis underlying the term "victimless crime". So-called victimless crimes or crimes without victims were tested to determine whether a case could be argued that the behaviour produced harmful consequences for innocent people (p19) recognising that there was substantial disagreement both about the degree of culpability inherent in the behaviour and the proper role for the law. Consequently, the effectiveness and scope of the law has proved limited, both creating and solving problems. The following are examples of the research findings used to construct arguments that there are victims. It is accepted that there are other arguments that many consider equally convincing (as an example).

=== Drugs ===
The use of drugs for religious and recreational purposes is historically verified among a wide range of cultures. In more modern times, Inciardi (1992: 1–17) reports that the use of opium, cocaine, and, later, morphine were common ingredients of patent medicines, and "opium dens" were not uncommon in the larger urban areas. Extracts from the coca leaf were included in the original Coca-Cola and, in 1900, heroin was promoted as a cough medication and a treatment for lung diseases. But problems flowing from addiction led many to perceive the drug element of medications to be morally destructive. In the United States, the Supreme Court decisions of Webb et al. v U.S. 249 U.S. 96 (1919) and U.S. v Behrman 258 U.S. 280 (1922) drove the use of narcotics underground and consolidated their criminal status.

In the terms adopted by Schur (1965), drug dealing is now victimless because neither the buyer nor the seller is likely to report it. The consumption of some drugs can damage the health of users causing indirect societal cost due to increased hospitalizations and, in some cases, cause death through overdose because substitution or poor quality, although this potential for harm may be operationally indistinct from the potentials for harm associated with other noncriminal behaviors, such as driving a car while tired or over-consumption of healthy foods. Some argue that if drugs were available legally, they would be less harmful (see the drug policy of the Netherlands). When drugs are illegal, the price is higher, and maintaining the habit takes the money that would otherwise be spent on food, shelter, and clothing. The resultant neglect is a contributory factor to the addict's physical deterioration. In Australia, Walker (1991) finds a strong link between substance abuse and crime. In general, making drugs illegal results in an exponential increase in their price so that addicts must indulge in theft, robbery, and burglary to support their habits.

Those people who experience those crimes are indirect victims of the drug sale. The need to fund addiction also drives some into distribution where they are more prone to violent attack and murder. These findings are matched elsewhere. Meier and Geis (1997) confirm that drug dealing is an area where victims are third parties who experience harm only indirectly through, say, losses from drug-related crime, and the costs of enforcing drug laws and of treating addiction, and the public health costs for treating illness and disease consequent on the addiction, e.g., HIV infection through using the same needles. In Australia, for example, the National Campaign against Drug Abuse (see Collins & Lapsley 1991) gives a figure of just over $1.2 billion for total costs of the abuse of illicit drugs in Australia in 1988, including treatment of drug-related illness, accidents resulting from drug use/misuse, loss of productivity due to absenteeism, premature death, property crime and damage, and excluding justice system costs. Conklin (1997: 100) reports the cost of illegal drug use in the U.S. in 1989 at $60 billion a year, a 20% increase over the estimate in 1985. The rise in cost to the state can only be met out of tax revenue, but the burden is not shared equally. Income actually spent on drugs is displaced from purchases that would otherwise have generated sales tax and income tax revenue. Similarly, the substantial profits made by the dealers is not taxed. Thus, the citizens who declare income for tax purposes must pay more to offset the cost of non-capture of drug revenue in their society.

As with prostitution, crime related to drug dealing also affects the amenity of a neighbourhood, destroying property values and causing the flight of the middle class to the "safer" suburbs. If the police do intervene, they may alienate law-abiding community members who are stopped and questioned, and only displace the drug dealing indoors, thus making it more resistant to police interventions. Police may also use their power to extract rents from the drug selling community. Further, Sampson (2002) comments that because intensive police enforcement is by its very nature temporary, the impact is often only short-term and dependent on the resiliency of the market and the buyers which has been shown to be strong. Some officers have argued that intensive enforcement shows the community that the police care about the problem; however, some of the unintended effects may, in fact, have the opposite result. For a more general exposition, see arguments for and against drug prohibition.

== See also ==
- Anti-social behaviour
- Drug-related crime
- Public Order Act 1986
- Victimless crime
- Sumptuary law
- Anti-social behaviour order
- Broken windows theory
- Moral police
- Signal crime
- Islamic religious police
- Wisdom of repugnance
- Picking quarrels and provoking trouble
