= Broken windows theory =

Criminological theory

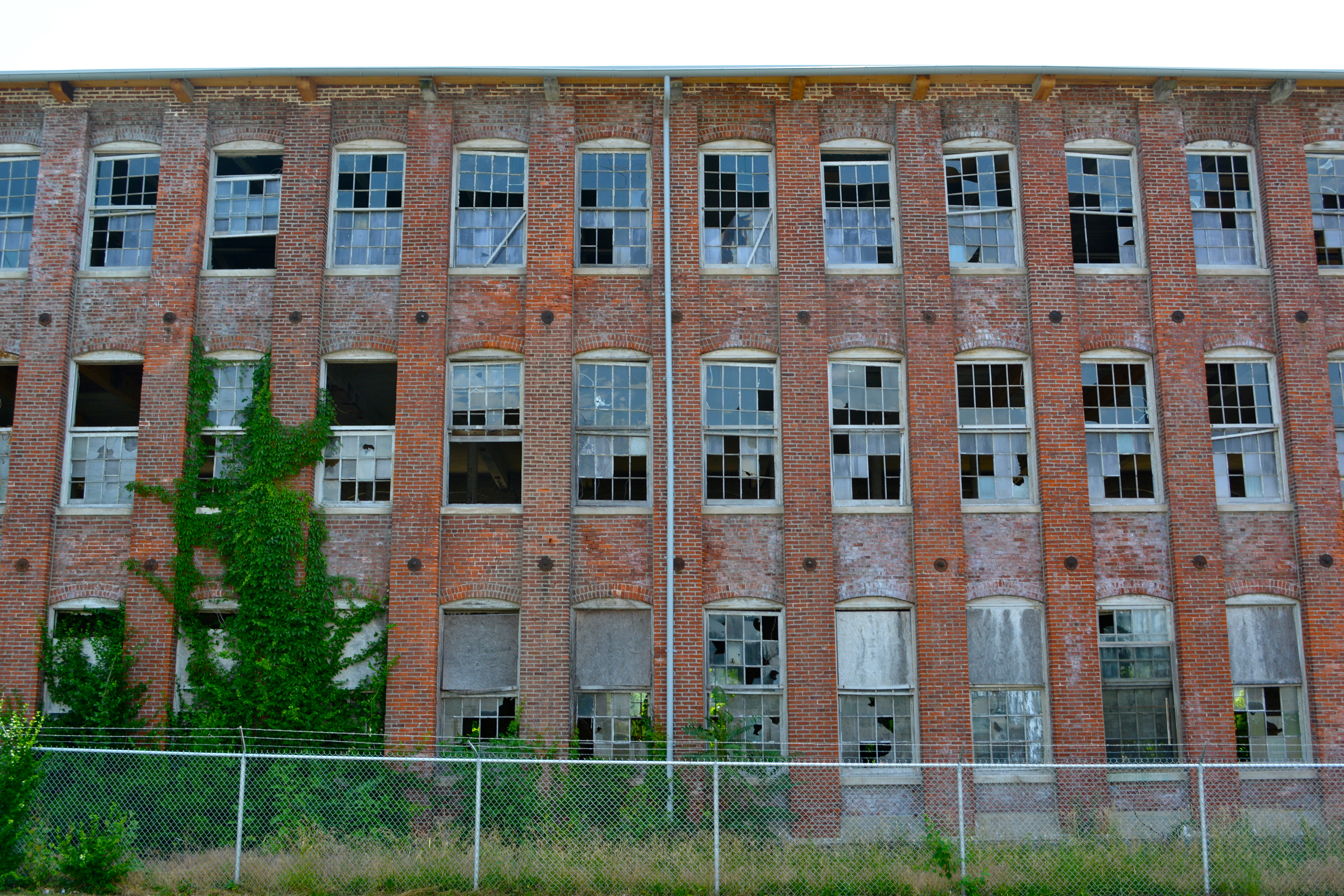
Broken windows of the Stehli Silk Mill in Manheim Township, Lancaster County, Pennsylvania

In criminology, the broken windows theory states that visible signs of crime, antisocial behavior and civil disorder create an urban environment that encourages further crime and disorder, including serious crimes. The theory suggests that policing methods that target minor crimes, such as vandalism, loitering, public drinking and fare evasion, help to create an atmosphere of order and lawfulness.

The theory was introduced in an article started in 1981 and published in 1982 by social scientists James Q. Wilson and George L. Kelling. It was popularized in the 1990s by New York City police commissioner William Bratton, whose policing policies were influenced by the theory.

The theory became subject to debate both within the social sciences and the public sphere. Broken windows policing has been enforced with controversial police practices, such as the frequent use of stop-and-frisk in New York City in the decade up to 2013.

== Article and crime prevention ==
James Q. Wilson and George L. Kelling first introduced the broken windows theory in an article titled "Broken Windows", in the March 1982 issue of The Atlantic Monthly:

Social psychologists and police officers tend to agree that if a window in a building is broken and is left unrepaired, all the rest of the windows will soon be broken. This is as true in nice neighborhoods as in rundown ones. Window-breaking does not necessarily occur on a large scale because some areas are inhabited by determined window-breakers whereas others are populated by window-lovers; rather, one un-repaired broken window is a signal that no one cares, and so breaking more windows costs nothing. (It has always been fun.)

The article received a great deal of attention and was very widely cited. A 1996 criminology and urban sociology book, Fixing Broken Windows: Restoring Order and Reducing Crime in Our Communities by George L. Kelling and Catharine Coles, is based on the article but develops the argument in greater detail. It discusses the theory in relation to crime and strategies to contain or eliminate crime from urban neighborhoods.

A successful strategy for preventing vandalism, according to the book's authors, is to address the problems when they are small. Repair the broken windows within a short time, say, a day or a week, and the tendency is that vandals are much less likely to break more windows or do further damage. Clean up the sidewalk every day, and the tendency is for litter not to accumulate, or for the rate of littering to be much less. Problems are less likely to escalate and thus respectable residents do not flee the neighborhood.

Oscar Newman introduced defensible space theory in his 1972 book Defensible Space. He argued that although police work is crucial to crime prevention, police authority is not enough to maintain a safe and crime-free city. People in the community help with crime prevention. Newman proposed that people care for and protect spaces that they feel invested in, arguing that an area is eventually safer if the people feel a sense of ownership and responsibility towards the area. Broken windows and vandalism are still prevalent because communities simply do not care about the damage. Regardless of how many times the windows are repaired, the community still must invest some of their time to keep it safe. Residents' negligence of broken window-type decay signifies a lack of concern for the community. Newman says this is a clear sign that the society has accepted this disorder—allowing the unrepaired windows to display vulnerability and lack of defense. Canadian writer Malcolm Gladwell also relates this theory to the reality of New York City in his book, The Tipping Point.

Thus, the theory makes a few major claims: that improving the quality of the neighborhood environment reduces petty crime, anti-social behavior, and low-level disorder, and that major crime is also prevented as a result. Criticism of the theory has tended to focus on the latter claim.

== Theoretical explanation ==
The reason the state of the urban environment may affect crime consists of three factors: social norms and conformity; the presence or lack of routine monitoring; and social signaling and signal crime.

In an anonymous urban environment, with few or no other people around, social norms and monitoring are not clearly known. Thus, individuals look for signals within the environment as to the social norms in the setting and the risk of getting caught violating those norms; one of the signals is the area's general appearance.

Under the broken windows theory, an ordered and clean environment, one that is maintained, sends the signal that the area is monitored and that criminal behavior is not tolerated. Conversely, a disordered environment, one that is not maintained (broken windows, graffiti, excessive litter), sends the signal that the area is not monitored and that criminal behavior has little risk of detection.

The theory assumes that the landscape "communicates" to people. A broken window transmits to criminals the message that a community displays a lack of informal social control and so is unable or unwilling to defend itself against a criminal invasion. It is not so much the actual broken window that is important, but the message the broken window sends to people. It symbolizes the community's defenselessness and vulnerability and represents the lack of cohesiveness of the people within. Neighborhoods with a strong sense of cohesion fix broken windows and assert social responsibility on themselves, effectively giving themselves control over their space.

The theory emphasizes the built environment, but must also consider human behavior.

Under the impression that a broken window left unfixed leads to more serious problems, residents begin to change the way they see their community. In an attempt to stay safe, a cohesive community starts to fall apart, as individuals start to spend less time in communal space to avoid potential violent attacks by strangers. The slow deterioration of a community, as a result of broken windows, modifies the way people behave when it comes to their communal space, which, in turn, breaks down community control. As rowdy teenagers, panhandlers, addicts, and prostitutes slowly make their way into a community, it signifies that the community cannot assert informal social control, and citizens become afraid that worse things will happen. As a result, they spend less time in the streets to avoid these subjects and feel less and less connected from their community, if the problems persist.

At times, residents tolerate "broken windows" because they feel they belong in the community and "know their place". Problems, however, arise when outsiders begin to disrupt the community's cultural fabric. That is the difference between "regulars" and "strangers" in a community. The way that "regulars" act represents the culture within, but strangers are "outsiders" who do not belong.

Consequently, daily activities considered "normal" for residents now become uncomfortable, as the culture of the community carries a different feel from the way that it was once.

With regard to social geography, the broken windows theory is a way of explaining people and their interactions with space. The culture of a community can deteriorate and change over time, with the influence of unwanted people and behaviors changing the landscape. The theory can be seen as people shaping space, as the civility and attitude of the community create spaces used for specific purposes by residents. On the other hand, it can also be seen as space shaping people, with elements of the environment influencing and restricting day-to-day decision making.

However, with policing efforts to remove unwanted disorderly people that put fear in the public's eyes, the argument would seem to be in favor of "people shaping space", as public policies are enacted and help to determine how one is supposed to behave. All spaces have their own codes of conduct, and what is considered to be right and normal will vary from place to place.

The concept also takes into consideration spatial exclusion and social division, as certain people behaving in a given way are considered disruptive and therefore, unwanted. It excludes people from certain spaces because their behavior does not fit the class level of the community and its surroundings. A community has its own standards and communicates a strong message to criminals, by social control, that their neighborhood does not tolerate their behavior. If, however, a community is unable to ward off would-be criminals on their own, policing efforts help.

By removing unwanted people from the streets, the residents feel safer and have a higher regard for those that protect them. People of less civility who try to make a mark in the community are removed, according to the theory.

== Concepts ==
=== Informal social controls ===
Many claim that informal social control can be an effective strategy to reduce unruly behavior. Garland (2001) expresses that "community policing measures in the realization that informal social control exercised through everyday relationships and institutions is more effective than legal sanctions." Informal social control methods have demonstrated a "get tough" attitude by proactive citizens, and express a sense that disorderly conduct is not tolerated. According to Wilson and Kelling, there are two types of groups involved in maintaining order, 'community watchmen' and 'vigilantes'. With broken windows theory, the United States has, in some ways, adopted policing strategies of pre-modern Europe where informal social control was the norm. Wilson and Kelling (1982) find that, in pre-modern times, as there was no statutory framework for law enforcers to follow, informal policing was primarily 'objective' driven.

Wilcox et al. 2004 argue that improper land use can cause disorder, and the larger the public land is, the more susceptible it will be to criminal deviance. Therefore, nonresidential spaces, such as businesses, may assume the responsibility of informal social control "in the form of surveillance, communication, supervision, and intervention". It is expected that more strangers occupying the public land creates a higher chance for disorder. Jane Jacobs can be considered one of the original pioneers of this perspective of broken windows. Much of her book, The Death and Life of Great American Cities, focuses on residents' and nonresidents' contributions to maintaining order on the street, and explains how local businesses, institutions, and convenience stores provide a sense of having "eyes on the street".

Social indifference or apathy poses a problem to the "eyes on the street" theory of informal social control, as many residents feel that regulating disorder in the community is not their responsibility. Wilson and Kelling cite psychological research that suggest people often refuse to go to the aid of someone seeking help, not due to a lack of concern or selfishness "but the absence of some plausible grounds for feeling that one must personally accept responsibility". On the other hand, others plainly refuse to put themselves in harm's way, depending on how grave they perceive the nuisance to be; a 2004 study observed that "most research on disorder is based on individual level perceptions decoupled from a systematic concern with the disorder-generating environment." Essentially, everyone perceives disorder differently, and can contemplate seriousness of a crime based on those perceptions. However, Wilson and Kelling feel that although community involvement can make a difference, "the police are plainly the key to order maintenance."

=== Role of fear ===
Ranasinghe argues that the concept of fear is a crucial element of broken windows theory, because it is the foundation of the theory. She also adds that public disorder is "... unequivocally constructed as problematic because it is a source of fear". Fear is elevated as perception of disorder rises; creating a social pattern that tears the social fabric of a community and leaves the residents feeling hopeless and disconnected. Wilson and Kelling hint at the idea, but do not focus on its central importance. They indicate that fear was a product of incivility, not crime, and that people avoid one another in response to fear, weakening controls. Hinkle and Weisburd found that police interventions to combat minor offenses, as with the broken windows model, "significantly increased the probability of feeling unsafe," suggesting that such interventions might offset any benefits of broken windows policing in terms of fear reduction.

=== Comparison to "zero tolerance" ===
Broken windows policing is sometimes described as a "zero-tolerance" policing style, including in some academic studies. Bratton and Kelling have said that broken windows policing and zero tolerance are different, and that minor offenders should receive lenient punishment.

== Critical developments ==
In an earlier publication of The Atlantic released March 1982, Wilson wrote an article indicating that police efforts had gradually shifted from maintaining order to fighting crime. This indicated that order maintenance was something of the past, and soon it would seem as it has been put on the back burner. The shift was attributed to the rise of the social urban riots of the 1960s, and "social scientists began to explore carefully the order maintenance function of the police, and to suggest ways of improving it—not to make streets safer (its original function) but to reduce the incidence of mass violence". Other criminologists argue between similar disconnections, for example, Garland argues that throughout the early and mid 20th century, police in American cities strived to keep away from the neighborhoods under their jurisdiction. This is a possible indicator of the out-of-control social riots that were prevalent at that time. Still many would agree that reducing crime and violence begins with maintaining social control/order.

Jane Jacobs' The Death and Life of Great American Cities is discussed in detail by Ranasinghe, and its importance to the early workings of broken windows, and claims that Kelling's original interest in "minor offences and disorderly behaviour and conditions" was inspired by Jacobs' work. Ranasinghe includes that Jacobs' approach toward social disorganization was centralized on the "streets and their sidewalks, the main public places of a city" and that they "are its most vital organs, because they provide the principal visual scenes". Wilson and Kelling, as well as Jacobs, argue on the concept of civility (or the lack thereof) and how it creates lasting distortions between crime and disorder. Ranasinghe explains that the common framework of both sets of authors is to narrate the problem facing urban public places. Jacobs, according to Ranasinghe, maintains that "Civility functions as a means of informal social control, subject little to institutionalized norms and processes, such as the law" 'but rather maintained through an' "intricate, almost unconscious, network of voluntary controls and standards among people... and enforced by the people themselves".

== Case studies ==
=== Precursor experiments ===
Before the introduction of this theory by Wilson and Kelling, Philip Zimbardo, a Stanford psychologist, arranged an experiment testing the broken-window theory in 1969. Zimbardo arranged for an automobile with no license plates and the hood up to be parked idle in a Bronx neighbourhood and a second automobile, in the same condition, to be set up in Palo Alto, California. The car in the Bronx was attacked within minutes of its abandonment. Zimbardo noted that the first "vandals" to arrive were a family—a father, mother, and a young son—who removed the radiator and battery. Within twenty-four hours of its abandonment, everything of value had been stripped from the vehicle. After that, the car's windows were smashed in, parts torn, upholstery ripped, and children were using the car as a playground. At the same time, the vehicle sitting idle in Palo Alto sat untouched for more than a week until Zimbardo himself went up to the vehicle and deliberately smashed it with a sledgehammer. Soon after, people joined in for the destruction, although criticism has been levelled at this claim as the destruction occurred after the car was moved to the campus of Stanford university and Zimbardo's own students were the first to join him. Zimbardo observed that the majority of the adult "vandals" in both cases was primarily well dressed, Caucasian, clean-cut and seemingly respectable individuals. It is believed that, in a neighborhood such as the Bronx where the history of abandoned property and theft is more prevalent, vandalism occurs much more quickly, as the community generally seems apathetic. Similar events can occur in any civilized community when communal barriers—the sense of mutual regard and obligations of civility—are lowered by actions that suggest apathy.

=== New York City ===
In 1985, the New York City Transit Authority hired George L. Kelling, the author of Broken Windows, as a consultant. Kelling was later hired as a consultant to the Boston and the Los Angeles police departments.

One of Kelling's adherents, David L. Gunn, implemented policies and procedures based on the Broken Windows Theory, during his tenure as President of the New York City Transit Authority. One of his major efforts was to lead a campaign from 1984 to 1990 to rid graffiti from New York's subway system.

In 1990, William J. Bratton became head of the New York City Transit Police. Bratton was influenced by Kelling, describing him as his "intellectual mentor". In his role, he implemented a tougher stance on fare evasion, faster arrestee processing methods, and background checks on all those arrested.

After being elected Mayor of New York City in 1993, Rudy Giuliani hired Bratton as his police commissioner to implement similar policies and practices throughout the city. Giuliani heavily subscribed to Kelling and Wilson's theories. Such policies emphasized addressing crimes that negatively affect quality of life. In particular, Bratton directed beat officers to more strictly enforce laws against petty offenses like subway fare evasion, public drinking, public urination, and graffiti. Bratton also revived the New York City Cabaret Law, a previously dormant Prohibition-era ban on dancing in unlicensed establishments. Throughout the late 1990s, the New York Police Department (NYPD) shut down many of the city's acclaimed nightspots for illegal dancing.

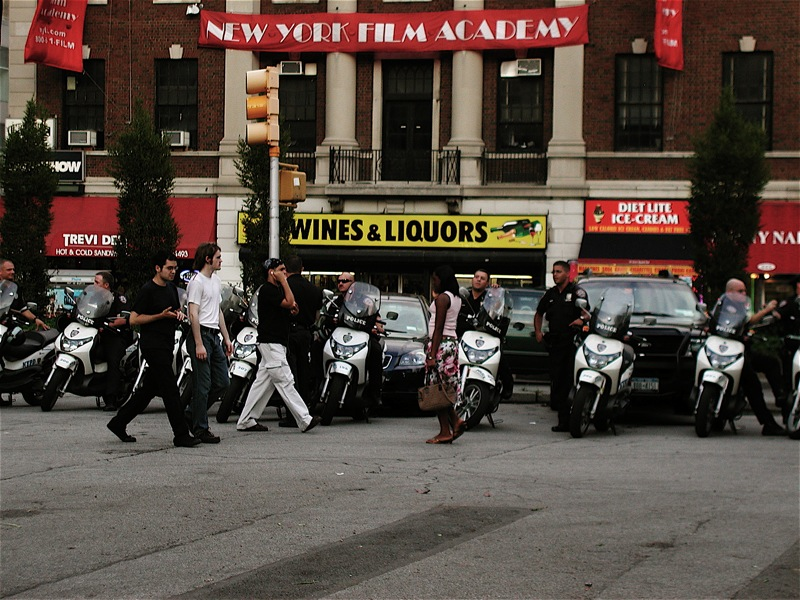
New York City Police Department officers c. 2005

According to a 2001 study by Kelling and William Sousa of crime trends in New York City, rates of both petty and serious crime saw significant drops after the aforementioned quality-of-life policing policies were implemented. Furthermore, crime across all categories continued to decline for the following ten years. This data suggested that policies based on the Broken Windows Theory were effective. Later, in 2016, Brian Jordan Jefferson used the precedent of Kelling and Sousa's study to conduct fieldwork in the 70th precinct of New York City, in which it was corroborated that crime mitigation in the area concerned "quality of life" issues, which included noise complaints and loitering. The falling crime rates throughout New York City had built a mutual relationship between residents and law enforcement in vigilance of disorderly conduct.

However, other studies do not find a causal relationship between the adoption of such policies and decreases in crime. The decrease may have been part of a broader trend across the United States. The rates of most crimes, including all categories of violent crime, made consecutive declines from their peak in 1990, under Giuliani's predecessor, David Dinkins. Other cities also experienced less crime, even though they had different police policies. Other factors, such as the 39% drop in New York City's unemployment rate between 1992 and 1999, could also explain the decrease reported by Kelling and Sousa.

A 2017 study found that when the NYPD stopped aggressively enforcing minor legal statutes in late 2014 and early 2015 that civilian complaints of the major crimes of burglary, felony assault, and grand larceny, decreased slightly with large error bars during and shortly after sharp reductions in proactive policing. There was no statistically significant effect on other major crimes such as murder, rape, robbery, or grand theft auto. These results are touted as challenging prevailing scholarship as well as conventional wisdom on authority and legal compliance by implying that aggressively enforcing minor legal statutes incites more severe criminal acts.

=== Albuquerque ===
Albuquerque, New Mexico, instituted the Safe Streets Program in the late 1990s based on the Broken Windows Theory. The Safe Streets Program sought to deter and reduce unsafe driving and incidence of crime by saturating areas where high crime and crash rates were prevalent with law enforcement officers. Operating under the theory that American Westerners use roadways much in the same way that American Easterners use subways, the developers of the program reasoned that lawlessness on the roadways had much the same effect as it did on the New York City Subway. Effects of the program were reviewed by the US National Highway Traffic Safety Administration (NHTSA) and were published in a case study. The methodology behind the program demonstrates the use of deterrence theory in preventing crime.

=== Lowell, Massachusetts ===
In 2005, Harvard University and Suffolk University researchers worked with local police to identify 34 "crime hot spots" in Lowell, Massachusetts. In half of the spots, authorities cleared trash, fixed streetlights, enforced building codes, discouraged loiterers, made more misdemeanor arrests, and expanded mental health services and aid for the homeless. In the other half of the identified locations, there was no change to routine police service.

The areas that received additional attention experienced a 20% reduction in calls to the police. The study concluded that cleaning up the physical environment was more effective than misdemeanor arrests.

=== Netherlands ===
In 2007 and 2008, Kees Keizer and colleagues from the University of Groningen conducted a series of controlled experiments to determine if the effect of existing visible disorder (such as litter or graffiti) increased other crime such as theft, littering, or other antisocial behavior. They selected several urban locations, which they arranged in two different ways, at different times. In each experiment, there was a "disorder" condition in which violations of social norms as prescribed by signage or national custom, such as graffiti and littering, were clearly visible as well as a control condition where no violations of norms had taken place. The researchers then secretly monitored the locations to observe if people behaved differently when the environment was "disordered". Their observations supported the theory. The conclusion was published in the journal Science: "One example of disorder, like graffiti or littering, can indeed encourage another, like stealing."

=== Mexico City ===
An 18-month study by Carlos Vilalta in Mexico City showed that the framework of Broken Windows Theory on homicide in suburban neighborhoods was not a direct correlation, but a "concentrated disadvantage" in the perception of fear and modes of crime prevention. In areas with more social disorder (such as public intoxication), an increased perception of law-abiding citizens feeling unsafe amplified the impact of homicide occurring in the neighborhood. It was also found that it was more effective in preventing instances of violent crime among people living in areas with less physical structural decay (such as graffiti), lending credence to the Broken Windows Theory basis that law enforcement is trusted more among those in areas with less disorder.

Furthering this data, a 2023 study conducted by Ricardo Massa on residency near clandestine dumpsites associated economic disenfranchisement with high physical disorder. The neighborhoods that had high concentrations of landfill waste were correlated with crimes (such as vehicle theft and robbery), and most significantly crimes related to property. In a space where property damage and neglect is normalized, a person's response to this type of environment can also greatly be affected by their perception of their surroundings. It was also concluded that non-residents of these high-concentration areas tended to fear and avoid these locations, seeing as there was typically less surveillance and lack of community efficacy surrounding clandestine dumpsites. However, despite this fear, Massa also notes that, in this case, individual targets for crime (such as homicide or rape) were unlikely compared to the vandalism of public and private property.

== Other effects ==
=== Real estate ===
Other side effects of better monitoring and cleaned up streets may well be desired by governments or housing agencies and the population of a neighborhood; broken windows can count as an indicator of low real estate value and may deter investors. Real estate professionals may benefit from adopting the "Broken Windows Theory", because if the number of minor transgressions is monitored in a specific area, there is likely to be a reduction in major transgressions as well. This may actually increase or decrease value in a house or apartment, depending on the area. Fixing windows is, therefore, also a step of real estate development, which may lead, whether it is desired or not, to gentrification. By reducing the number of broken windows in the community, the inner cities would appear to be attractive to consumers with more capital. Eliminating danger in spaces that are notorious for criminal activity, such as downtown New York City and Chicago, would draw in investment from consumers, increase the city's economic status, and provide a safe and pleasant image for present and future inhabitants.

=== Education ===
In education, the broken windows theory is used to promote order in classrooms and school cultures. The belief is that students are signaled by disorder or rule-breaking and that they in turn imitate the disorder. Several school movements encourage strict paternalistic practices to enforce student discipline. Such practices include language codes (governing slang, curse words, or speaking out of turn), classroom etiquette (sitting up straight, tracking the speaker), personal dress (uniforms, little or no jewelry), and behavioral codes (walking in lines, specified bathroom times).

From 2004 to 2006, Stephen B. Plank and colleagues from Johns Hopkins University conducted a correlational study to determine the degree to which the physical appearance of the school and classroom setting influence student behavior, particularly in respect to the variables concerned in their study: fear, social disorder, and collective efficacy. They collected survey data administered to 6th-8th grade students by 33 public schools in a large mid-Atlantic city. From analyses of the survey data, the researchers determined that the variables in their study are statistically significant to the physical conditions of the school and classroom setting. The conclusion, published in the American Journal of Education, was:

...the findings of the current study suggest that educators and researchers should be vigilant about factors that influence student perceptions of climate and safety. Fixing broken windows and attending to the physical appearance of a school cannot alone guarantee productive teaching and learning, but ignoring them likely greatly increases the chances of a troubling downward spiral.

=== Statistical evidence ===
A 2015 meta-analysis of broken windows policing implementations found that disorder policing strategies, such as "hot spots policing" or problem-oriented policing, result in "consistent crime reduction effects across a variety of violent, property, drug, and disorder outcome measures". As a caveat, the authors noted that "aggressive order maintenance strategies that target individual disorderly behaviors do not generate significant crime reductions," pointing specifically to zero tolerance policing models that target singular behaviors such as public intoxication and remove disorderly individuals from the street via arrest. The authors recommend that police develop "community co-production" policing strategies instead of merely committing to increasing misdemeanor arrests.

== Criticism ==
=== Other factors ===
Several studies have argued that many of the apparent successes of broken windows policing (such as New York City in the 1990s) were the result of other factors. They claim that the "broken windows theory" conflates correlation with causality: reasoning prone to fallacy. David Thacher, assistant professor of public policy and urban planning at the University of Michigan, stated in a 2004 paper:

[S]ocial science has not been kind to the broken windows theory. A number of scholars reanalyzed the initial studies that appeared to support it. ... Others pressed forward with new, more sophisticated studies of the relationship between disorder and crime. The most prominent among them concluded that the relationship between disorder and serious crime is modest, and even that relationship is largely an artifact of more fundamental social forces.

C. R. Sridhar, in his article in the Economic and Political Weekly, also challenges the theory behind broken windows policing and the idea that the policies of William Bratton and the New York Police Department was the cause of the decrease of crime rates in New York City. The policy targeted people in areas with a significant amount of physical disorder and there appeared to be a causal relationship between the adoption of broken windows policing and the decrease in crime rate. Sridhar, however, discusses other trends (such as New York City's economic boom in the late 1990s) that created a "perfect storm" that contributed to the decrease of crime rate much more significantly than the application of the broken windows policy. Sridhar also compares this decrease in crime rate with other major cities that adopted various policies and determined that the broken windows policy is not as effective.

In a 2007 study called "Reefer Madness" in the journal Criminology and Public Policy, Harcourt and Ludwig found further evidence confirming that mean reversion fully explained the changes in crime rates in the different precincts in New York in the 1990s. Further alternative explanations that have been put forward include the waning of the crack epidemic, unrelated growth in the prison population due to the Rockefeller drug laws, and that the number of imprisoned males from ages 16 to 24 was dropping regardless of the shape of the US population pyramid.

It has also been argued that rates of major crimes also dropped in many other US and non-US cities during the 1990s, both those that had adopted broken windows policing and those that had not. It is thought that this is due to the exposure of children to environmental lead, which leads to loss of impulse control and hence, when they reach young adulthood, criminal acts. There appears to be a correlation between a 25-year lag between the addition and removal of lead from paint and gasoline and rises and falls in arrests for murder.

In his book, Baltimore criminologist Ralph B. Taylor argues that fixing windows is only a partial and short-term solution. His data support a materialist view: changes in physical decay, superficial social disorder, and racial composition do not lead to higher crime, but economic decline does. He contends that the example shows that real, long-term reductions in crime require that urban politicians, businesses, and community leaders work together to improve the economic fortunes of residents in high-crime areas.

In 2015, Northeastern University assistant professor Daniel T. O'Brien criticised the broken window theory model. Using his Big Data based research model, he argues that the broken window model fails to capture the origins of crime in a neighbourhood. He concludes that crime comes from the social dynamics of communities and private spaces and spills into public spaces.

=== Relationship between crime and disorder ===
According to a study by Robert J. Sampson and Stephen Raudenbush, the premise on which the theory operates, that social disorder and crime are connected as part of a causal chain, is faulty. They argue that a third factor, collective efficacy, "defined as cohesion among residents combined with shared expectations for the social control of public space," is the cause of varying crime rates observed in an altered neighborhood environment. They also argue that the relationship between public disorder and crime rate is weak.

In the winter 2006 edition of the University of Chicago Law Review, Bernard Harcourt and Jens Ludwig looked at the later Department of Housing and Urban Development program that rehoused inner-city project tenants in New York into more-orderly neighborhoods. The broken windows theory would suggest that these tenants would commit less crime once moved because of the more stable conditions on the streets. However, Harcourt and Ludwig found that the tenants continued to commit crimes at the same rate. Another tack was taken by a 2010 study, which questioned the theory's legitimacy concerning the subjectivity of disorder as perceived by persons living in neighborhoods. It concentrated on whether citizens view disorder as separate from crime or identical to it. The study noted that crime cannot be the result of disorder if the two are identical, agreed that disorder provided evidence of "convergent validity" and concluded that the broken windows theory misinterprets the relationship between disorder and crime.

=== Racial bias ===
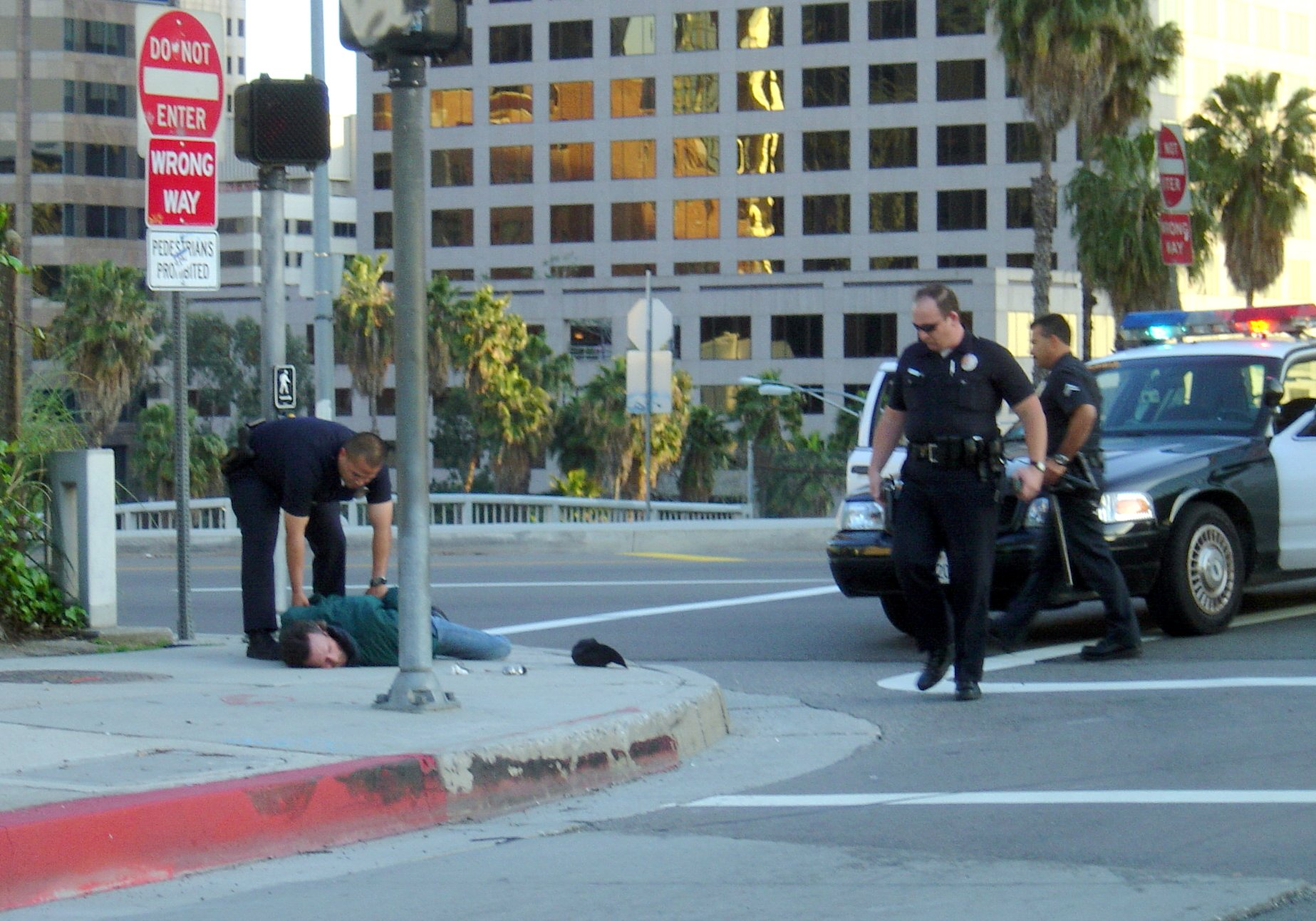
Man being arrested

Broken windows policing has sometimes become associated with zealotry, which has led to critics suggesting that it encourages discriminatory behaviour. Some campaigns such as Black Lives Matter have called for an end to broken windows policing. In 2016, a Department of Justice report argued that it had led the Baltimore Police Department to discriminate against and alienate minority groups.

A central argument is that the term disorder is vague, and giving the police broad discretion to decide what disorder is will lead to discrimination. In Dorothy Roberts's article, "Foreword: Race, Vagueness, and the Social Meaning of Order Maintenance and Policing", she says that the broken windows theory in practice leads to the criminalization of communities of color, who are typically disfranchised. She underscores the dangers of vaguely written ordinances that allow for law enforcers to determine who engages in disorderly acts, which, in turn, produces a racially skewed outcome in crime statistics. Similarly, Gary Stewart wrote, "The central drawback of the approaches advanced by Wilson, Kelling, and Kennedy rests in their shared blindness to the potentially harmful impact of broad police discretion on minority communities." According to Stewart, arguments for low-level police intervention, including the broken windows hypothesis, often act "as cover for racist behavior".

The theory has also been criticized for its unsound methodology and its manipulation of racialized tropes. Specifically, Bench Ansfield has shown that in their 1982 article, Wilson and Kelling cited only one source to prove their central contention that disorder leads to crime: the Philip Zimbardo vandalism study (see Precursor Experiments above). But Wilson and Kelling misrepresented Zimbardo's procedure and conclusions, dispensing with Zimbardo's critique of inequality and community anonymity in favor of the oversimplified claim that one broken window gives rise to "a thousand broken windows". Ansfield argues that Wilson and Kelling used the image of the crisis-ridden 1970s Bronx to stoke fears that "all cities would go the way of the Bronx if they didn't embrace their new regime of policing." Wilson and Kelling manipulated the Zimbardo experiment to avail themselves of the racialized symbolism found in the broken windows of the Bronx.

Robert J. Sampson argues that based on common misconceptions by the masses, it is implied that those who commit disorder and crime have a clear tie to groups suffering from financial instability and may be of minority status: "The use of racial context to encode disorder does not necessarily mean that people are racially prejudiced in the sense of personal hostility." He notes that residents make a clear implication of who they believe is causing the disruption, which has been termed as implicit bias. He further states that research conducted on implicit bias and stereotyping of cultures suggests that community members hold unrelenting beliefs of African Americans and other disadvantaged minority groups, associating them with crime, violence, disorder, welfare, and undesirability as neighbors. A later study indicated that this contradicted Wilson and Kelling's proposition that disorder is an exogenous construct that has independent effects on how people feel about their neighborhoods.

In response, Kelling and Bratton have argued that broken windows policing does not discriminate against law-abiding communities of minority groups if implemented properly. They cited Disorder and Decline: Crime and the Spiral of Decay in American Neighborhoods, a study by Wesley Skogan at Northwestern University. The study, which surveyed 13,000 residents of large cities, concluded that different ethnic groups have similar ideas as to what they would consider to be "disorder".

Minority groups have tended to be targeted at higher rates by the broken windows style of policing. Broken windows policies have been used more heavily in minority neighborhoods where low-income, poor infrastructure and social disorder were widespread, causing minority groups to perceive that they were being racially profiled under broken windows policing.

=== Class bias ===
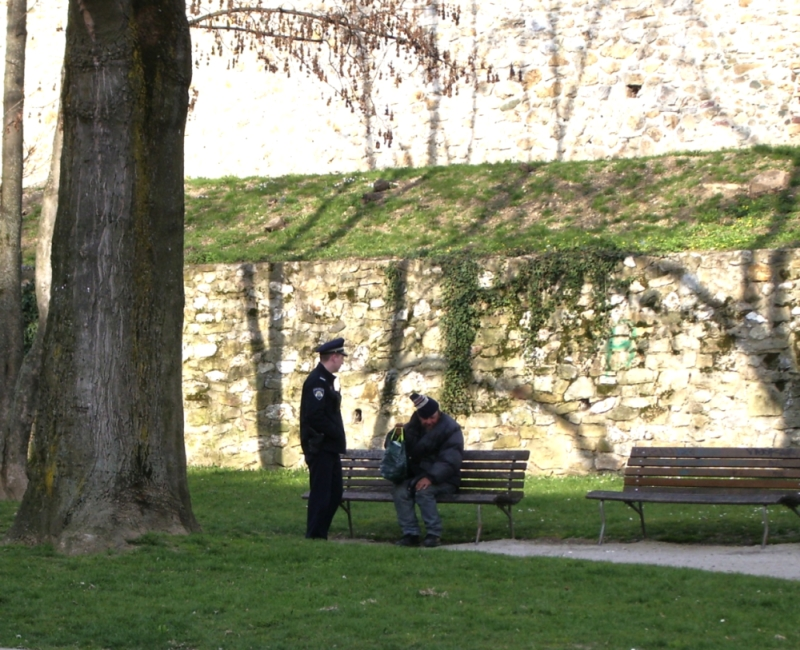
Homeless man talking with a police officer

A common criticism of broken windows policing is the argument that it criminalizes the poor and homeless. That is because the physical signs that characterize a neighborhood with the "disorder" that broken windows policing targets correlate with the socio-economic conditions of its inhabitants. Many of the acts that are considered legal but "disorderly" are often targeted in public settings and are not targeted when they are conducted in private. Therefore, those without access to a private space are frequently criminalized. Critics, such as Robert J. Sampson and Stephen Raudenbush of Harvard University, see the application of the broken windows theory in policing as a war against the poor, as opposed to a war against more serious crimes. Since minority groups in most cities are more likely to be poorer than the rest of the population, a bias against the poor would be linked to a racial bias.

According to Bruce D. Johnson, Andrew Golub, and James McCabe, applying the broken windows theory in policing and policymaking can result in development projects that decrease physical disorder but promote undesired gentrification. Often, when a city is so "improved" in this way, the development of an area can cause the cost of living to rise higher than residents can afford, which forces low-income people out of the area. As the space changes, the middle and upper classes, often white, begin to move into the area, resulting in the gentrification of urban, poor areas. The residents are affected negatively by such an application of the broken windows theory and end up evicted from their homes as if their presence indirectly contributed to the area's problem of "physical disorder".

=== Popular press ===
In More Guns, Less Crime (2000), economist John Lott Jr. examined the use of the broken windows approach as well as community- and problem-oriented policing programs in cities over 10,000 in population, over two decades. He found that the impacts of these policing policies were inconsistent across different types of crime. Lott's book has been subject to criticism, while other groups support Lott's conclusions.

In the 2005 book Freakonomics, coauthors Steven D. Levitt and Stephen J. Dubner confirm and question the notion that the broken windows theory was responsible for New York's drop in crime, saying "the pool of potential criminals had dramatically shrunk". Levitt and co-author John Donohue attributed this reduction in crime to the legalization of abortion with Roe v. Wade, which correlated with a decrease, one generation later, in the number of delinquents in the population at large. Whether the authors' work meets the theoretical and statistical criteria for a causal relationship between abortion legalization and crime reduction remains highly disputed.

In his 2012 book Uncontrolled: The Surprising Payoff of Trial-and-Error for Business, Politics, and Society, Jim Manzi writes that of the randomized field trials conducted in criminology, only nuisance abatement per broken windows theory has been successfully replicated.

== See also ==
- Anti-social behaviour order
- Consent search
- Crime contagion model
- Criminal spin
- Crime in New York City
- Crime prevention through environmental design
- Fourth Amendment to the United States Constitution
- Graffiti abatement
- Homeowner's association
- Keeping up with the Joneses
- Legalized abortion and crime effect
- Bastiat's Parable of the broken window and the law of unintended consequences
- Pygmalion effect
- Racial profiling
- Safer Cities Initiative
- Social proof – Psychological phenomenon regarding conformity
- Stigmergy
- Stop-and-frisk in New York City
- Terry stop
- Tragedy of the commons
- William Wilberforce#Moral reform

== Bibliography ==
- Braga, Anthony A.; Welsh, Brandon C.; Schnell, Cory (June 4, 2015). "Can Policing Disorder Reduce Crime? A Systematic Review and Meta-analysis". Journal of Research in Crime and Delinquency. 52 (4): 567–588. doi:10.1177/0022427815576576. S2CID 76653190.
- Garland, D (2001), The Culture of Control: Crime and Order in Contemporary Society, Chicago, IL: The University of Chicago Press, ISBN 978-0-19-829937-0.
- Herbert, Steve; Brown, Elizabeth (September 2006), "Conceptions of Space and Crime in the Punitive Neoliberal City", Antipode, 38 (4): 755–77, Bibcode:2006Antip..38..755H, doi:10.1111/j.1467-8330.2006.00475.x.
- Hinkle, Joshua C.; Weisburd, David (November 2008), "The irony of broken windows policing: A micro-place study of the relationship between disorder, focused police crackdowns and fear of crime", Journal of Criminal Justice, 36 (6): 503–512, doi:10.1016/j.jcrimjus.2008.09.010.
- Jacobs, Jane (1961), The Death and Life of Great American Cities, New York: Random House, OL 5820238M.
- Ranasinghe, P (2012), "Jane Jacobs' framing of public disorder and its relation to the 'broken windows' theory", Theoretical Criminology, 16 (1): 63–84, doi:10.1177/1362480611406947, S2CID 144274542.
- Sampson, RJ; Raudenbush, SW (2004), "Seeing Disorder: Neighborhood Stigma and the Social Construction of "Broken Windows"", Social Psychology Quarterly, 67 (4): 319–42, doi:10.1177/019027250406700401, S2CID 8626641.
- Stewart, Gary (May 1998), "Black Codes and Broken Windows: The Legacy of Racial Hegemony in Anti-Gang Civil Injunctions", The Yale Law Journal, 107 (7): 2249–79, doi:10.2307/797421, JSTOR 797421.
- Wilcox, P; Quisenberry, N; Cabrera, DT; Jones, S (2004), "Busy places & broken windows?: Toward Defining the Role of Physical Structure and Process in Community Crime Models", Sociological Quarterly, 45 (2): 185–207, doi:10.1111/j.1533-8525.2004.tb00009.x, S2CID 145187908.
- Wilson, James Q; Kelling, George L (Mar 1982), "Broken Windows: The police and neighborhood safety", The Atlantic, archived from the original on 2010-05-14 (Broken windows (PDF), Manhattan institute, archived (PDF) from the original on 2015-06-19).
