= Tucson Police Department =

- Patch of Tucson Police Department

- Logo of Tucson Police Department

- Badge of Tucson Police Department
- Abbreviation: TPD
- Motto: "Ready to protect, Proud to Serve"

Agency overview
- Formed: 1871
- Employees: 1,015
- Annual budget: $193 million (2020)

Jurisdictional structure
- Operations jurisdiction: Tucson, Pima, Arizona, United States
- Population: 545,987 (2018)
- Legal jurisdiction: City of Tucson
- General nature: Local civilian police

Operational structure
- Headquarters: 270 S. Stone Ave; Tucson, AZ 85701
- Police Officers: 807
- Civilian employees: 208
- Agency executive: Chad Kasmar, Chief of Police

Facilities
- Divisions/Teams: 4
- Airbases: 1
- County Jails: Pima County Adult Detention Center (PCADC)
- Crown Vics(Being phased out), Police Intercepted Sedans and SUVs: 1,000
- Bell 206 Helicopters: 3
- Dogs: 11 German Shepherd/Belgian Malinois; 2 Black Labs

Notables
- Programme: Explorer Post #180

Website
- Tucson Police Website

The Tucson Police Department (TPD) is the law enforcement agency responsible for the city of Tucson. Sworn members of the Tucson Police Department are commissioned as peace officers by the Arizona Peace Officers Standards and Training (AZPOST) Board. This authority is valid throughout the State of Arizona at all times and locations.

Regardless of job assignment, non-sworn members shall not have authority over sworn members in matters involving the exercise or review of police powers. According to the department, the mission of the Tucson Police Department is to serve the public in partnership with the Tucson community, to protect life and property, prevent crime, and resolve problems.

The department is headed by the Chief of Police and is divided into three sections: Analysis, Engagement & Oversight Bureau, Investigative Services Bureau and Patrol Services Bureau (Largest and most visible of the three Sections)

== Operation divisions ==
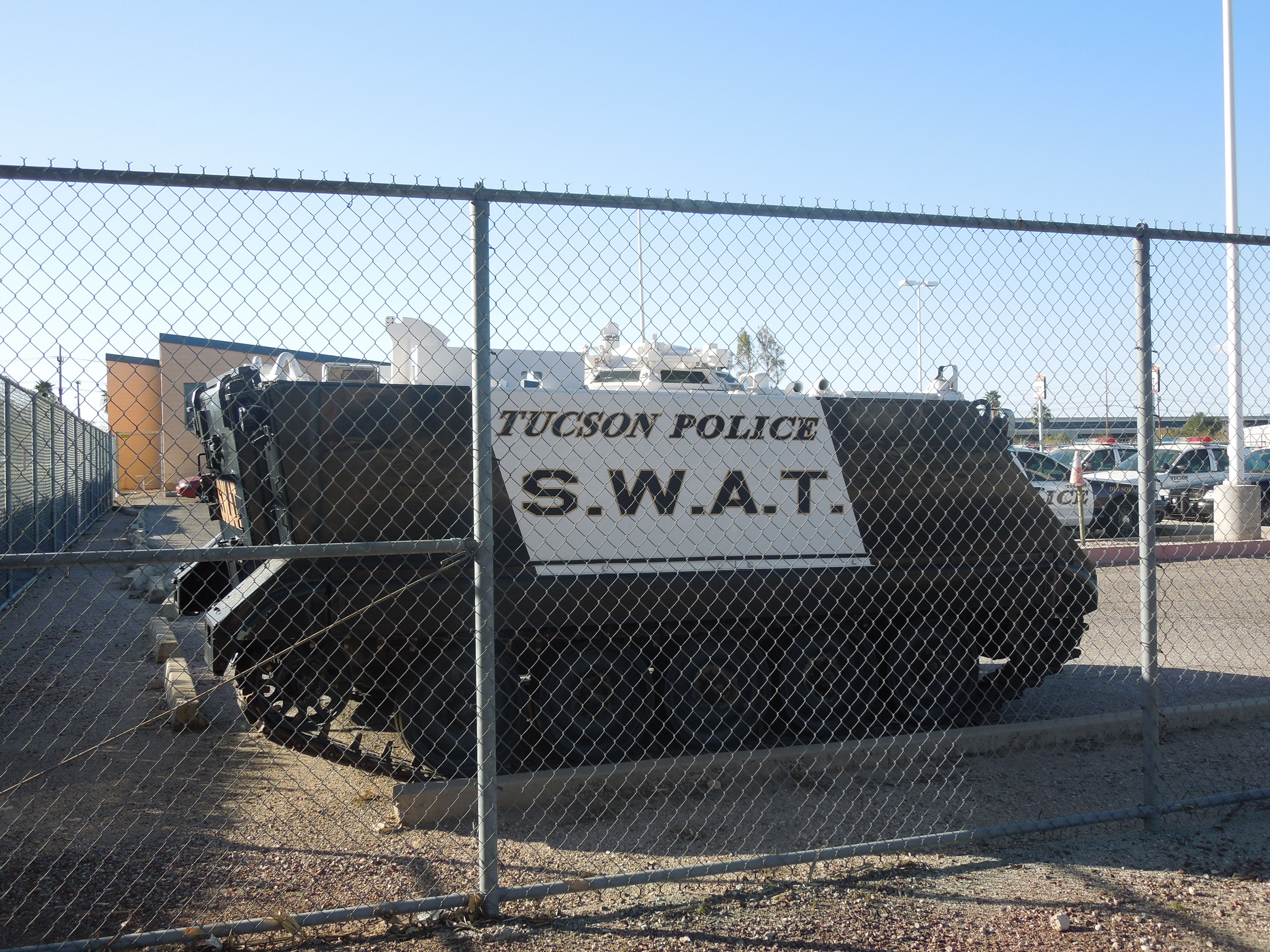
Tucson Police S.W.A.T. vehicle.

=== South ===
Operations Division South, known as "Team 1" and working out of the Santa Cruz Substation, is home to 167 officers. This team consists of 9 patrol squads, civilian staff, Neighborhood Crimes detectives, two Community Response Teams, and command staff.

Within the boundaries of Operations Division South are 30 active neighborhood associations. Officers attend their regular meetings, special events, and neighborhood cleanups, and are available to assist with solving problems facing a neighborhood.

Officers serve in mentoring programs, youth sports, music programs, volunteering with the elderly, and many church or social functions. The division spokesperson said "we realize we are not just here to support the community, but are a part of this community."

These traditional functions include protecting life and property, preserving the peace, enforcing laws, and arresting suspects.

=== West ===
Operations Division West, or "Team 2," provides police services to the northwest portion of the City of Tucson. Operations Division West is housed at the Westside Police Service Center 1310 W. Miracle Mile.

The division has nine uniformed patrol squads, 2 Community Response Teams that address specific problems in the division, as well as a Neighborhood Crimes Section that comprises detectives who investigate a variety of crimes that occur within the division's boundaries. Personnel are also available to provide information and assistance regarding crime prevention and the Crime-Free Multi-Housing Program.

Operations Division West is home to the Tucson Mall, which is one of the city's largest malls. There are many other businesses, particularly along Oracle Road and Stone Avenue, and a large collection of car dealerships along Auto Mall Drive. There are two Pima Community College campuses and two public high schools within the Division boundaries. Interstate 10 and Union Pacific railroad tracks bisect the division on a north–south line.

Some of the oldest neighborhoods in Tucson are in Operations Division West, and there are 22 organized neighborhood associations. The neighborhoods are diverse, ranging from historic barrio areas west of downtown Tucson, established residences in the center of the division, the Old Pascua Yaqui Village south of Grant Road, and newer homes and neighborhoods on the far west side, including the Marriott Starr Pass Resort.

Several of the older neighborhood associations on the west side of town joined in the 1990s and formed the Westside Coalition. This coalition was selected as a federally sponsored "Weed & Seed" site and has been operating successfully for over five years. This effort exemplifies the community-based policing model that is used in Operations Division West and throughout the Tucson Police Department. Patrol officers in the division are assigned to work with the neighborhoods and their respective associations on an ongoing basis.

The central and northern parts of the division are home to a large business area, including both the Interstate 10 business loop (Miracle Mile) and a large corridor of business development along Oracle Road, including the Tucson Mall and a collection of car dealerships. The older business loop is generally less prosperous and is home to some historic ills that the department continues to address. Prostitution and narcotics offenses predominate in this older area, and are worked on an ongoing basis by the Community Response Team.

The Community Response Team offers flexibility for the division in responding to crime problems and constituent complaints received from City Council offices. The officers in this unit are able to work varied hours in either uniform or plainclothes capacity. To combat the prostitution problem, for example, the Community Response Team frequently conducts "sting" operations where large-scale sweeps are made of not only the prostitutes, but their customers as well. These efforts, coupled with aggressive assistance from the prosecutors and courts, including placing zone restrictions to keep arrested prostitutes from returning to the area, have been helpful in dealing with this quality-of-life issue for local residents, according to Tucson police and several city council members.

=== Midtown ===
Operations Division Midtown, sometimes referred to as "Team 3," encompasses approximately 44 square miles. The geographical boundaries of the division are River Road to the north, First Avenue/Euclid to the west, Aviation Highway/Golf Links Road to the south and Craycroft Road to the east. Davis-Monthan Air Force Base and the University of Arizona also lie within the division.

The substation housing officers that are assigned to Operations Division Midtown is located at the Patrick K. Hardesty Midtown Multi-service Center.

Operations Division Midtown is one of five divisions within the Field Services Bureau of the Tucson Police Department. In 2006 the division got a new station, but in 2008 it suffered a decrease in employees from 180 to about 120 officers and civilian personnel. The division's command staff consists of a captain and three lieutenants. The majority of the officers working in the division are assigned to one of 12 patrol squads, each supervised by a sergeant. The focus of the division is to provide 24-hour police service to all citizens whether they live, work, or are just passing through the division.

The division is authorized 14 lead police officers, one for each of the 12 patrol squads, and the Community Response Team.. In addition to their regular duties, each lead police officer is assigned to act as a liaison with the division's Neighborhood Associations. Additionally, lead police officers schedule the attendance of an officer for Neighborhood Association meetings or functions.

In addition to the 12 patrol squads, the division deploys squads of officers assigned to the Community Response Team. This team's main responsibility is to proactively address crime problems specific to the Midtown Division and its neighborhoods. A community resource sergeant, a community resource officer, and a criminal intelligence officer are also on staff to serve as community liaisons. Their focus is to work on issues that will improve the quality of life for the citizens of Tucson.

Also housed in the substation is the Neighborhood Crimes Unit. This unit is composed of a Detective Sergeant and a squad of detectives. They investigate a variety of crimes committed within the division's boundaries. In addition to case followup and criminal arrests, detectives offer on-sight assistance and expertise to patrol officers.

Operations Division Midtown is unique, in that its boundaries fall within five of the six City Council Wards. Portions of Wards II, III, IV, V, and VI are interspersed throughout the division. The division is also home to one Level I trauma center, University Medical Center. UMC's trauma center is the only Level I trauma center in Tucson or Southern Arizona.

In 1980, Officer Smith was on routine patrol in the vicinity of Speedway Boulevard and Plumer Avenue when a motorist grazed the rear of his motorcycle. Officer Smith's motorcycle was thrown into the opposing lane of traffic, where he was struck head-on. He was pronounced dead at the scene.

In 2003, Officer Hardesty responded to a hit-and-run collision in the 800 block of east Ft. Lowell. A short time after his arrival, Officer Hardesty made contact with the suspect. A scuffle ensued, and Officer Hardesty was fatally shot.

=== Downtown ===
Operation division downtown is home to fifty police patrol officers, including one captain, two lieutenants, six sergeants and five detectives. Also housed in the main station is one marshal and four community service officers as well as the command structure of the department, though the command is not subordinate to the Downtown Division.

Members working in the team accomplish their mission using a community policing philosophy and a variety of assignments that include Motors, Bikes, Walking Beat, Headquarters Security, Prisoner Transport, Court Security, and Community Service.

The Downtown Division works with local stakeholders and community partners to maintain a safe and welcoming environment for everyone in the area. Its work also concerns the many visitors who come to the central business district to visit cultural and historic attractions, including the Tucson Historic District, Fourth Avenue, the Tucson Convention Center and the Temple of Music and Art.

In 1892, Officer Elliott was patrolling Meyer Street between McCormick and Cushing just after midnight when Santos Alvarado, a notorious criminal, confronted him. Alvarado drew a knife and attacked Officer Elliott. The officer sustained a stab wound through the heart and died at the scene. Alvarado was shot and killed by Officer Elliott. In 1902, Officer Katzenstein was in the vicinity of Broadway and Meyer Street when a fire broke out. He responded to assist as an officer and also as the elected Assistant Fire Chief. As he was opening a hydrant, he was shot five times by Teodoro Elias.

The Downtown Division is home to the only remaining Bicycle units. The bicycle patrol consists of 10 officers divided between a dedicated bicycle patrol squad and other evening patrol squads. In September 2012, a night time bicycle unit was stood up. The night bicycle detail worked the city's entertainment district on nights with high numbers of patrons of downtown. In December 2013, the night bicycle squad was dissolved and those night bicycle officers instead reported to patrol supervisors alongside patrol units. Starting in January 2014, there would around the week evening bicycle coverage.

The Walking Unit is also based out of ODD. The Walking beat is made up of 7 officers and is responsible for the immediate downtown area. A number of members of the walking unit are certified as Bicycle Patrol officers and ride bicycles on occasion.

Both the Walking Unit and Bicycle patrol use specialized equipment such as T3 Motion stand up vehicles, Yamaha 4WD quads, GEM Cars, and a Polaris Ranger.

=== East ===
Operation division East is the largest division in the city limits of Tucson. It has about 101 officers with seven sergeants and one captain. In 2006, Operations Division East had 1,200 officers; today it is about 9% of its historical maximum size.

Geographically, East has the distinction of being the largest (in area) of the five patrol divisions within the Tucson Police Department, covering almost 120 square miles. That accounts for over 50% of the land mass within the city limits. Operations Division East's boundaries are the eastern section of the city starting at Craycroft and running to the eastern city limits. The Operations Division East substation is located in the Golf Links Municipal Complex on Golf Links Road just east of Harrison. Operations Division East shares the complex with the George Miller Golf Links Branch Library.

Operations Division East has four major components: uniform patrol, Community Response Team, Bike Officers, and the Neighborhood Crime Section. There are eight patrol sectors in Operations Division East serviced by eleven patrol squads. In addition to answering calls for service, they work traffic enforcement and directed patrolling. The Community Response Team works in uniform or plainclothes, dealing with specific problems within the division. The Bike Officers complement uniform patrol in patrolling potential trouble spots.

In June 2008, Officer Hite was fatally shot in the line of duty by Nick Delich. Delich, who also shot another law enforcement officer and struck another with his vehicle, was sentenced to Life in Prison on April 30, 2012. He is committed to the Arizona State Psychiatric Hospital.

== History ==
=== John Dillinger arrest ===
Gangster John Dillinger and three associates were arrested in Tucson on 21 January 1934. The men were staying at the Hotel Congress, which suffered a fire. Members of the fire department recognized Dillinger from photos published in True Detective Mysteries magazine. He was transferred to Lake County Jail in Crown Point, Indiana, and escaped a month later driving away in the sheriff's car.

=== 1997 NCAA riot ===
In 1997 over 5000 fans spilled onto the streets to celebrate the University of Arizona's victory over Kentucky in the NCAA championship. Many fans set buildings and cars on fire. Tucson Police officers responded with riot gear to disperse the crowd. Four people, including a police officer were injured. At least 40 people who said they were not involved in the disturbance, but were in the location of the riots, reported to have been struck by less lethal munitions.

=== 2001 NCAA riot ===
In 2001 an estimated 2,000 fans had spilled into the streets after Arizona lost the NCAA championship to Duke in Minneapolis. Police fired stun grenades and rubber bullets to disperse University of Arizona fans who had overturned vehicles and set at least three on fire.

=== 2011 Sex scandal ===
In 2015, police Chief Roberto Villaseñor announced the conclusion of a four-year long internal investigation of police misconduct concerning local prostitution. Four police officers and crime scene technician were fired, two others resigned.

=== 2014 NCAA riot ===
In 2014 riots broke out on University Boulevard on March 27 during the NCAA Tournament's Sweet Sixteen round and on March 29 during the NCAA Tournament's Elite Eight round.

The March 27 riot occurred as a few hundred fans rushed out of bars, to the streets, damaged property and started some fights among themselves. The fights and the crowd were quickly controlled by police. Local news reported that police had been preparing for such situations this year to prevent celebrations from getting out of control like they had in the past. The department was criticized for not having enough presence after the game in order to prevent a riot.

The March 29 riot occurred after Arizona had lost to Wisconsin by one point in overtime. Several hundred people spilled out onto the street from bars and restaurants and congregated on University Boulevard, only to be met by 60 to 70 riot police who had been standing in the street since before the game had started. Media reports indicate that fans were at first peaceful before some fans began throwing cans and bottles at police. Police asked fans to move out of the street with a megaphone. After initial warnings, store managers asked customers to leave their restaurants and bars. After police had obtained approval to declare an unlawful assembly, they formed a skirmish line and identified themselves as police officers though a megaphone. Soon later, after five minutes for a period of about 40–50 minutes police ordered that fans disperse the unlawful assembly "in the name of the state of Arizona." While some fans left, many refused to leave and began chanting "Fuck the Police." Fans then started throwing firecrackers at police. Police responded with 9 OC Vapor Aerosol Canisters to control the crowd, but the canisters had little effect as the crowd continued to throw objects at police and become more violent toward police. The crowd then began chanting "Police Brutality." Police reminded rioters that the gathering had been declared an unlawful gathering that they were ordered to leave. Next, police responded by shooting about 200 pepper ball rounds, two Arwen Rounds, and 4 foam baton rounds at fans which created a distance between officers and fans that ultimately broke up the crowd. During the exchange of non-lethal fire, police arrested 15 people, 14 of which they released later that night. No injuries were reported and the only property damage came from a knocked down street sign. Charges included unlawful assembly, resisting arrest and disorderly conduct.

While many citizens complained of police brutality, only three complaints were filed. The most famous of these complaints involves an incident caught on a cellphone video of a woman who appears to be walking west on a sidewalk on University Boulevard when she is knocked down by an officer and pushed over a bench. The officer in the video is a police sergeant who has been with the department for 16 years. He was interviewed by internal affairs. As of April 1, the department gathered video taken by officer-worn cameras and interviewing witnesses and the woman about the incident to determine what kind of threat the woman posed and if the amount of force used was justified for what she was doing. The woman, Christina Gardilcic, has demanded an apology on ABC News as well as local KOLD news. Ms. Gardilcic believes the police sergeant used excessive force with his baton as he knocked her over a bench. She argues she was never told she could not be in the unlawful assembly area. As of October 23, 2014 the Pima County Chief Criminal Deputy wrote that "while his [the officer's] use of force in those incidents was 'overzealous' and 'not necessary,' his intent was 'to protect the back of the (police) skirmish line and to keep people out of the riot area.'" The prosecutor also argued that it's not criminal intent if you're maintaining public order during a riot and that without evidence of criminal intent the "state would be unable to prove any criminal charge beyond a reasonable doubt." Ms. Gardilcic's attorney filed a suit against the City of Tucson for $375,000 for mental anguish, frustration, and fear. The city settled for $20,000. Internal Affairs is still investigating if the officer's actions are a violation of department policy.

The police chief wrote the following on the TPD Facebook page, in which he asked for people to allow time for the investigation into police conduct: "These are difficult situations that often put law enforcement in a no-win situation. On the night of Thursday, March 27, the Sweet 16, we did not deploy additional resources in the area, and we had to draw resources from across the city to deal with the hundreds of people that took over University Blvd. Even though we had never experienced that type of crowd reaction so early in the tournament, there were some questions as to why we were not ready and deployed. So for the Elite 8 on Saturday, we did deploy additional resources based upon what happened two nights earlier and are now questioned as to whether our presence was the cause for the disturbance."

Sergeant Joel Mann was suspended for two weeks without pay after video surfaced of him slamming a girl during the event.

=== Killing of Carlos Ingram-Lopez ===
In April 2020, police Chief Chris Magnus offered his resignation after video emerged showing three police officers handcuffing a drunken man. He was then ignored as he died. After an internal investigation the policemen resigned.

== Budget issues ==
At the end of 2011, TPD (Tucson Police Department) had a total 932 employees compared to 960 in 1990 and 980 employees in 2006. Tucson Police suffered a great amount of major budget cuts due to cuts from the City of Tucson, State of Arizona, and federal funding.

Most police officers were not laid off because they were allowed to leave through attrition. Attrition levels increased as officers experienced cuts to pensions, salaries, and increased work without extra pay. Downsizing was the main reason for low morale within the department and decreased police service for the local community. Much of the departmental cuts were actually transfers to other city departments, such as TPD finance employees, records, and IT support. Many other trained officers that left though natural attrition took jobs in other law enforcement agencies.

In August 2010, the City of Tucson faced a $51 million budget deficit. Voters voted down a half-cent sales tax increase in November. TPD said they would be forced to cut 274 positions. While the positions were removed, the department did not see any employee layoffs because of increased attrition. According to an MSNBC article in June 2012, "From South Tucson to the east side, Tucsonans say they've noticed TPD's staff reduction."

In the fourth quarter of 2011, the City of Tucson was able to see increases in sales tax revenue allowing for TPD to start hiring again.

In early 2012, the department said it was experiencing trouble trying to recruit new employees, but has increased commissioned officers from around 750 officers to 1200.

On June 7, 2012, TPD announced it would hire an additional 150 officers and other support personnel. In June 2012 TPD also announced that it would hire additional crime lab and dispatch employees. While starting salaries were 20% lower than they were in similar departments around the country, law enforcement personnel is on the rise. In an MSNBC article, TPD officials say it will be a while until vacated positions are filled. "New hires" take about 1.5 years to hit the street after applying.

As of April 4, 2013 the May hiring process was canceled. TPD plans to continue growth starting August 2, 2013 with a new academy of police recruits.

On February 5, 2014, the city manager notified the City Council that his office projected a $33.2 million budget deficit for the next fiscal year, not including an additional $20.5 million of other immediate needs facing the city, such as maintenance on police vehicles. It is unclear how this deficit will affect the city, but the mayor was optimistic.

On March 25, 2014, the City Council voted to approve the city manager's plan to avoid cuts to core services. While Parks and Recreation among other departments received large cuts, Police and Fire lost their ability to receive overtime, if called out. For example: If an officer works during a vacation day or a day off, they will not receive pay.

== Organization ==
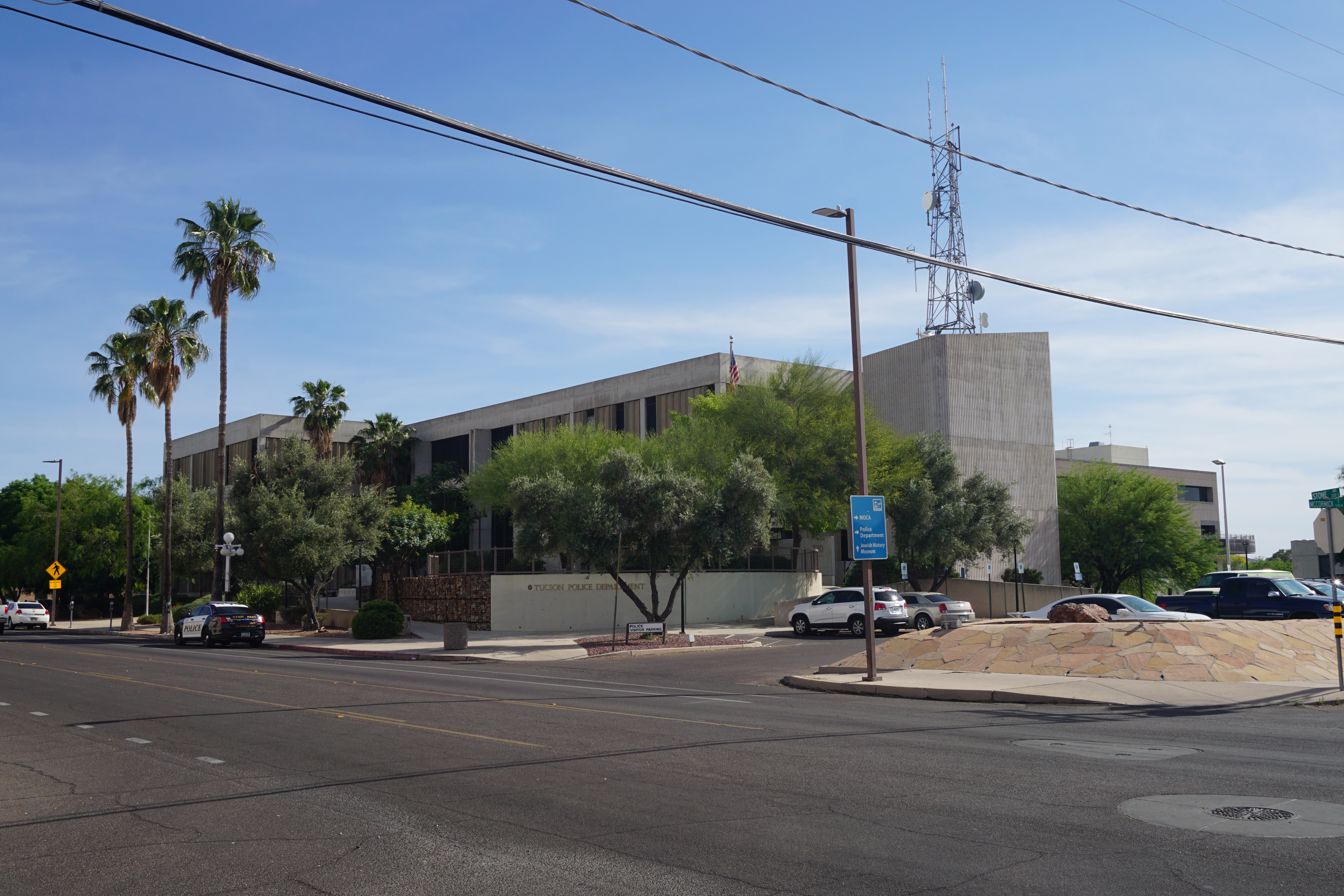
Tucson Police Department building

Title	Insignia
Chief of Police	
Deputy Chief	
Assistant Chief	
Captain	
Lieutenant	
Sergeant	
Lead Police Officer	
Detective	
Police Officer	
Police Reserve Officer	
Police Recruit	
Police Volunteer	

Once the organization increases in number the above ranks are expected to become filled, if unfilled.

- The Chief of department usually oversees all operations and law enforcement within the city.
- Assistant and Deputy Chiefs serve as commanders of the Public Integrity, Investigative, and Support Bureaus.
- Captains supervise a command division.
- Lieutenants assist Captains in supervision of a division. They also command units.

== See also ==
- List of law enforcement agencies in Arizona
