= Immorality =

Violation of moral laws and standards

Immorality is the violation of moral laws, norms or standards. It refers to an agent doing or thinking something they know or believe to be wrong. Immorality is normally applied to people or actions, or in a broader sense, it can be applied to groups or corporate bodies, and works of art.

== Ancient Greece ==
Callicles and Thrasymachus are two characters of Plato's dialogues, Gorgias and Republic, respectively, who challenge conventional morality.

Aristotle saw many vices as excesses or deficits in relation to some virtue, as cowardice and rashness relate to courage. Some attitudes and actions – such as envy, murder, and theft – he saw as wrong in themselves, with no question of a deficit/excess in relation to the mean.

== Religion ==
In Judaism, Christianity and Islam, three Abrahamic religions, a sin is a central concept in understanding immorality.

Immorality is often closely linked with both religion and sexuality. Max Weber saw rational articulated religions as engaged in a long-term struggle with more physical forms of religious experience linked to dance, intoxication and sexual activity. Durkheim pointed out how many primitive rites culminated in abandoning the distinction between licit and immoral behavior.

Freud's dour conclusion was that "In every age immorality has found no less support in religion than morality has".

== Sexual immorality ==
Coding of sexual behavior has historically been a feature of all human societies; as too has been the policing of breaches of its mores – sexual immorality – by means of formal and informal social control. Interdictions and taboos among primitive societies were arguably no less severe than in traditional agrarian societies. In the latter, the degree of control might vary from time to time and region to region, being least in urban settlements; however, only the last three centuries of intense urbanisation, commercialisation and modernisation have broken with the restrictions of the pre-modern world, in favor of a successor society of fractured and competing sexual codes and subcultures, where sexual expression is integrated into the workings of the commercial world.

Nevertheless, while the meaning of sexual immorality has been drastically redefined in recent times, arguably the boundaries of what is acceptable remain publicly policed and as highly charged as ever, as the decades-long debates in the US over reproductive rights after Roe v. Wade, or 21st-century controversy over child images on Wikipedia and Amazon would tend to suggest.

Defining sexual immorality across history is difficult as many different religions, cultures and societies have held contradictory views about sexuality. But there is an almost universal disdain for two sexual practices throughout history. These two behaviors include infidelity within a monogamous, romantic relationship and incest between immediate family members.

Other than these two practices, some cultures throughout history have permitted sexual behaviors considered obscene by many cultures today, such as marriage between cousins, polygyny, underage sex, rape during war or forced assimilation, and even zoophilia.

== Modernity ==
Michel Foucault considered that the modern world was unable to put forward a coherent morality – an inability underpinned philosophically by emotivism. Nevertheless, modernism has often been accompanied by a cult of immorality, as for example when John Ciardi acclaimed Naked Lunch as "a monumentally moral descent into the hell of narcotic addiction".

== Immoral psychoanalysis ==
Psychoanalysis received much early criticism for being the unsavory product of an immoral town – Vienna; psychoanalysts for being both unscrupulous and dirty-minded.

Freud himself however was of the opinion that "anyone who has succeeded in educating himself to truth about himself is permanently defended against the danger of immorality, even though his standard of morality may differ". Nietzsche referred to his ethical philosophy as "Immoralism."

== Literary references ==
- When questioned by a proof-reader whether his description of Meleager as the immoral poet should be immortal poet, T. E. Lawrence replied: "Immorality I know. Immortality I cannot judge. As you please: Meleager will not sue us for libel".
- De Quincey set out an (inverted) hierarchy of immorality in his study On Murder Considered as One of the Fine Arts: "if once a man indulges himself in murder, very soon he comes to think little of robbing; and from robbing he comes next to drinking and Sabbath-breaking, and from that to procrastination and incivility...this downward path".

== See also ==
- Amorality
- Antinomianism
- Anti-social behaviour
- Baudelaire
- Criminality
- Deviance (sociology)
- Disinhibition – disregard for social conventions and norms
- Ethics
- Evil
- Harm
- Hedonism
- Libertine
- Limit-experience
- Bernard Mandeville
- Mann Act
- Morality
  - Morality in Islam
- Moral psychology
- Perversion
- Raunch culture
- Repressive desublimation
- Selfishness
- Sexual ethics
- Seven deadly sins
- Sin
- Vice
- Wickedness
