= School spirit =

Sense of school community

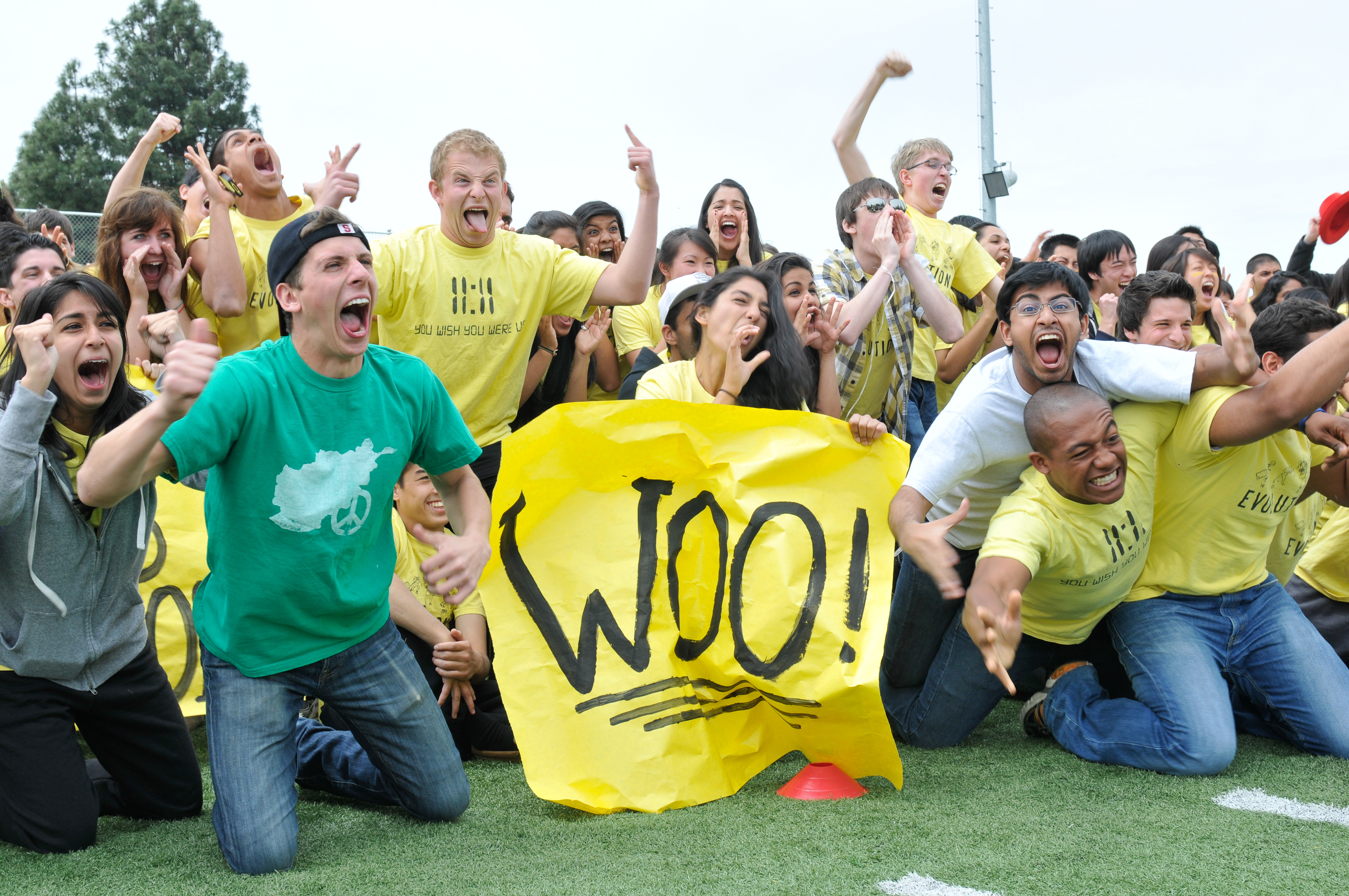
Spirit rally at the Harker School in San Jose, California

In United States education, school spirit refers to a collective identity between the members of an educational institution. School administrators may wish to foster school spirit with the goal of creating a sense of community within the student population, mitigating feelings of student detachment and anonymity or as a form of informal social control.

Around the turn of the 20th century educators like John Dewey and other Progressive educators began to encourage administrators and educators to attempt to inspire a sense of esprit de corps amongst their student body. By 1916 the term "school spirit" had become casually associated with this general concept.

School spirit was captured and critiqued in US pop culture through songs such as the Beach Boys' "Be True to Your School" and films with a coming of age story such as Fast Times at Ridgemont High. School spirit could also have the added advantage of lowering bullying rates by harboring a school climate of connectedness and belonging that lowers the rate of cyber-bullying.

== Spirit week and traditional events ==
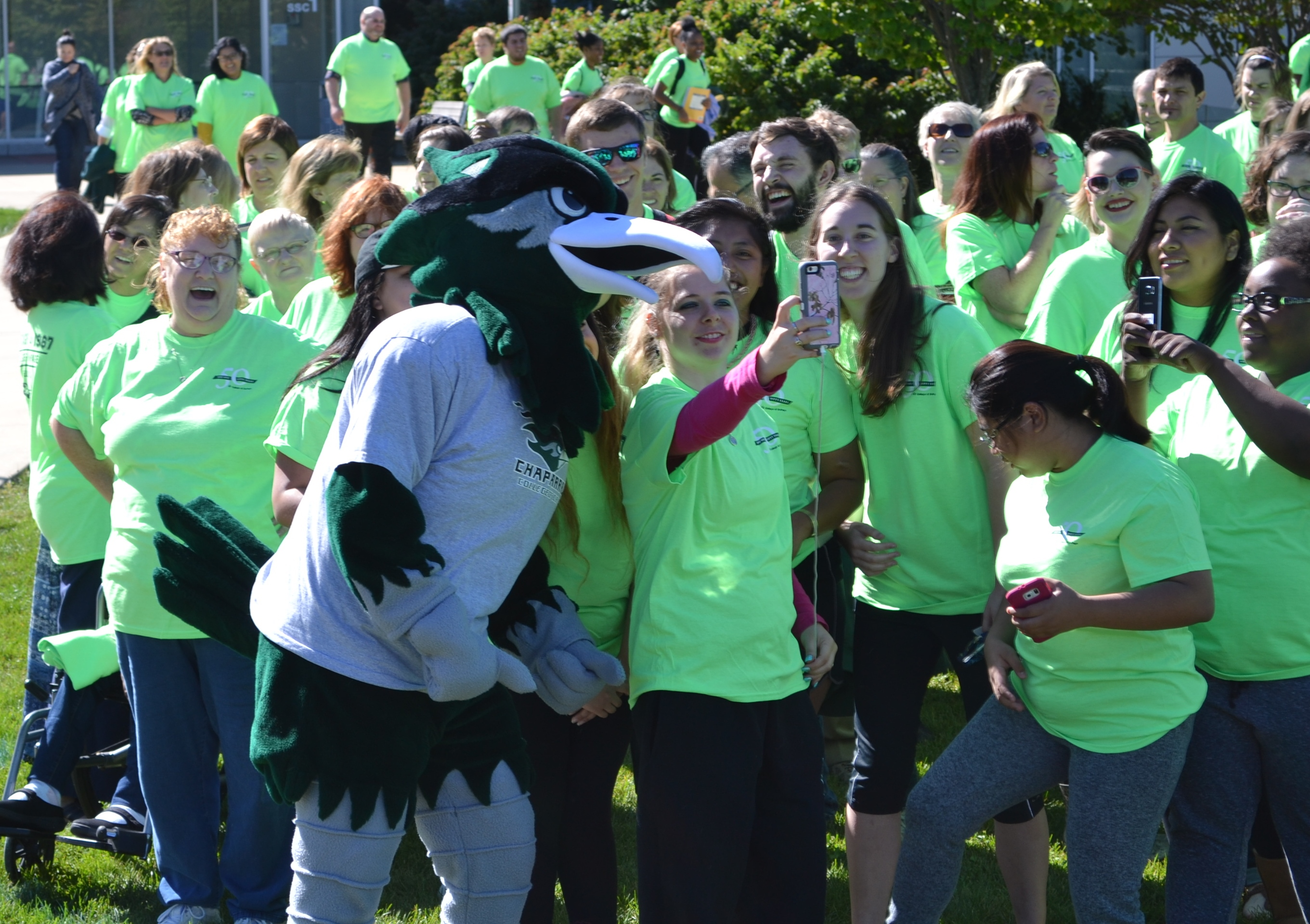
Spirit week event at the College of DuPage in Illinois

School spirit may refer to participation in extracurricular activities, school costume days, attending sports events, drives, or fundraising for clubs or organizations. Students may perform chants or songs at a pep rally or in common areas between classes. Schools may host assemblies in which students and staff members participate-in or watch color guard, cheer routines, talent shows, JROTC foot drills, and/or marching and pep bands during school days.

Schools may hold spirit week events, during which members of a school are encouraged to display school spirit across several days by wearing school colors, wearing fancy dress (usually called "dress up days" in the USA) to match a certain theme. Depending on the school, spirit weeks may occur the week of homecoming.

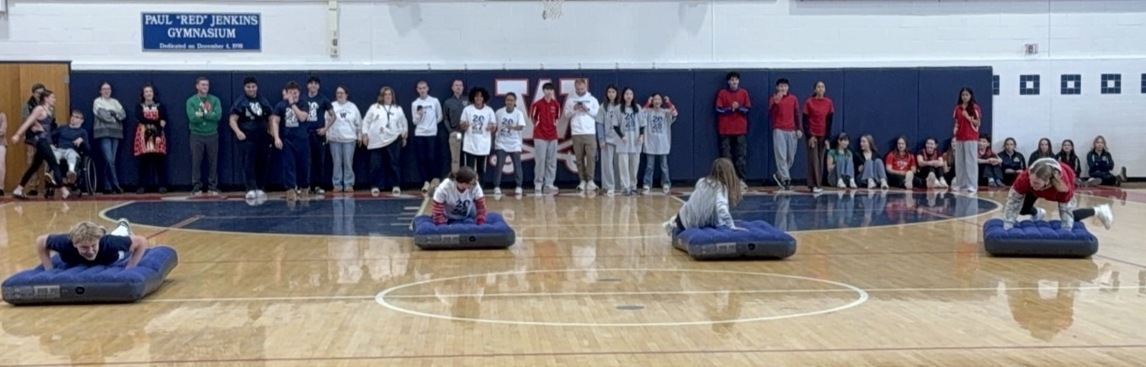
School spirit assemblies often include games or contests between students, sometimes by grade level. Here, four high school students slide on air mattresses in a race.

Administrators and staff may choose to hold such events because they believe there to be a correlation between school pride and higher self-esteem and/or greater academic performance. Spirit weeks and school spirit, more broadly, are not limited to high schools. Students within the United States are typically encouraged to have pride in their school and, in turn, themselves, from as early as pre-school and can continue through post-secondary school. Common critiques of school spirit are that too many days of events can overburden families of young children, that students who are low-income may not be able to participate, or that such activities are a distraction from a student's education.

== See also ==
- Cheerleader
- Pep squad
- Collective identity
