= George L. Kelling =

American criminologist (1935–2019)

- Born: George Lee Kelling; 21 August 1935; Milwaukee, Wisconsin, U.S.
- Died: 15 May 2019 (aged 83); Hanover, New Hampshire, U.S.
- Education: Northwestern Lutheran Theological Seminary; St. Olaf College (BA); University of Wisconsin–Milwaukee (MSW); University of Wisconsin–Madison (PhD)
- Scientific career
- Fields: Criminology

George Lee Kelling (August 21, 1935 – May 15, 2019) was an American criminologist, a professor in the School of Criminal Justice at Rutgers University–Newark, a senior fellow at the Manhattan Institute for Policy Research, and a fellow at the Kennedy School of Government at Harvard University. He previously taught at Northeastern University.

== Biography ==
Born in Milwaukee, Wisconsin, Kelling attended Northwestern Lutheran Theological Seminary to study theology for two years, but earned no degree. He received a B.A. in philosophy from St. Olaf College in Northfield, Minnesota, an M.S.W. from the University of Wisconsin–Milwaukee and a Ph.D. in social welfare from the University of Wisconsin–Madison in 1973, under Alfred Kadushin.

Early in his career, he was a child care counselor and a probation officer, but his later career was spent in academia. The author of numerous articles, he developed the broken windows theory with James Q. Wilson and Kelling's wife, Catherine M. Coles that led to the mass incarceration of African Americans in impoverished U.S. cities beginning in the mid-1980s. Kelling died in Hanover, New Hampshire on May 15, 2019, from complications of cancer at the age of 83.

== Personal life ==
Kelling was married twice, first to Sally Jean Mosiman, from whom he became divorced, and then to Catherine M. Coles, an attorney and a lawyer and anthropologist studying urban issues and criminal prosecution, whom Kelling married in 1982.
