= Crime contagion model =

Crime contagion models relate to the idea, of whether crime is contagious. Contagion models predict a positive relationship between neighborhood violent crime rates and the propensity of moving to opportunity (MTO) participants to engage in violent crime. The notion of crime spreading across surrounding environments feeds on the idea of clinical hysteria. Hysteria and the fear of crime are the main components of the contagion model.

A great measure used to determine if fear of crime exists can be determined by the evaluation of near repeats. Near repeats occur when a specific surrounding environment is targeted again for crime, areas of examples include neighborhoods, businesses, and schools. Near repeats have been proved to be a great factor in determining repeat victimization, and determining crime itself. Repeat victimization relates to near repeats, rather than a familiar victim it constitutes a familiar environment where crime is to be repeated.

== Empirical support ==
Neighborhood racial composition have a strong relationship with violent crime arrest which are robust to conditioning on changes in neighborhood poverty, violent-crime rates, or property-crime rates. Previous studies have also showed evidence that crime is in some way contagious. Research has displayed that being the victim of a crime one time significantly increases the likelihood of being victimized again in the future.

Variation in neighborhood yields no evidence that contagion is as important as much of the previous research would suggest in explaining across-neighborhood variation in crime rates. Variation in neighborhood has similar contagion probability than across neighborhood.

== Criticisms ==
Criticism that researchers might expect is, events that occurred close together might have similar MO (modus operandi) even if they were committed by unrelated offenders. Another controversy that the contagion model has is that mandatory reporting tends to draw criticism due to the nature that they do little more than to encourage reporting. Even if the law states an individual has to report a crime most do not due to conflict of interests or uncaring of the situation. Hot spots is one of the few strategies used by officers to determine where clusters of crime may occur. Crime hotspots are a good indicator for repeat victimization as well as near repeats. Although the issue of hot spots is that they are meso-level explanations and do not provide sufficient explanations to predict crime. Hotspots only measure a medium number of people, therefore it is faulty in some sense due to the limited number of population and amount of research. it does not measure the whole environment on a macro level. Studies show that crime, rather than being random crime, tends to happen in a cluster space. This evidence is also expected by the criminal spin theory, which phenomenologically explains an acceleration of criminality within a local area.

== See also ==
- Broken windows theory
- Criminal spin
