= Criminal spin =

Phenomenological model in criminology

Criminal spin is a phenomenological model in criminology, depicting the development of criminal behavior. The model refers to those types of behavior that start out as something small and innocent, without malicious or criminal intent and as a result of one situation leading to the next, an almost inevitable chain of reactions triggering counter-reactions is set in motion, culminating in a spin of ever-intensifying criminal behavior. The criminal spin model was developed by Natti Ronel and his research team in the department of criminology at Bar-Ilan University. It was first presented in 2005 at a Bar-Ilan conference entitled “Appropriate Law Enforcement”.

== Basic principles ==
- The elements of the criminal spin are found in most criminal behaviors.
- A criminal spin occurs when there is a sudden, rapid, or gradual acceleration of behavior that is considered criminal.
- The criminal spin model integrates different theories relating to the escalation in criminal or violent behavior, a criminal cycle of thinking or corresponding emotions.
- Although criminal behavior in its manifold manifestations has different cause, a common essence can be detected for a broad spectrum of so-called criminal behaviors, and this essence is the target of the criminal theory.
- The criminal spin indicates acute and chronic spin, as well as individual, group and community spin.

== Phenomenological basis ==
A basic premise of this theory is that criminality is subjective by nature and accordingly, the study of criminality or victimization should represent the perspective of those involved “from within”. This description focuses on process and meaning rather than on etiology and causality. As opposed to causal models and theories, the phenomenological emphasis allows for an in-depth examination of the individual essence of deviance in its various manifestations and offers a description and explanation of its inherent behavioral, emotional and cognitive mechanisms. This model explains group criminality as well as local criminality that relates to a specific neighborhood or community, while emphasizing the common phenomenological core.

== Development ==
A phenomenology analysis of the deviant behavior and numerous studies in criminology, including individual meetings with people who displayed various patterns of criminal, violent or addictive behavior in many circumstances, as well as interviews with those who fell victim to these behaviors led to the development of a comprehensive model that attempts to indicate a phenomenological essence that most of these behaviors have in common.

== Types ==
=== Acute ===
Acute criminal spin is an event, or subsequent events, that goes "out of control" and becomes criminal or violent. When active, this process operates as an almost inevitable chain of linked events that generate and continually intensify criminal behavior. There is a marked diminishment of personal control as the process proceeds. The acute criminal spin is distinct in an individual's life, different than the usual events. The intensity of the spin, reflecting the intensity of the deviant and criminal behavior, can be evaluated according to the frequency of acute spin episodes, their intensity as well as their characteristic array of behaviors.

=== Chronic ===
Rabbi Huna said: “Once a man committed a sin and repeated it, it becomes permissible to him.” (Yoma 86b) The spin might enter into a chronic phase, where the individual is trapped in related or recurring episodes of an acute criminal spin, or a sequential development of criminal, deviant, or violent activity. A chronic criminal spin is manifested in the development of a criminal lifestyle or career, as well as in repetitive patterns of criminal or offensive behavior. For example, research on problem gamblers describes a characteristic chronic spin, a process wherein the gamblers delve into a world of gambling that increasingly comes to rule their lives, while their ability to get out of the spin decreases as the process goes on. The chronic spin is accompanied by secondary, ever-intensifying, behaviors that serve as a cover-up (for example, some of the gamblers also have recourse to deception and drug use). It should be pointed out that there are periods in which the individual is not involved in any criminal activity or deviance, but behaves in a normative way like everyone else. It is precisely these periods of time that may mislead the observer.

=== Group ===
Parallel to the individual level, a criminal spin may be detected in groups as well. In addition, a large group such as an organization, an entire neighborhood, society or culture may exhibit behavior patterns that represent a criminal spin. For example, research on group rape shows that there is a process of mutual encouragement generating an acute collective spin leading the offenders to commit this grave crime. Group rape is often committed while committing another offense, e.g., robbery, and in line with Ben Azzai's warning in the Ethics of the Fathers that "one sin leads to another sin", the planned robbery also turns into an unplanned group rape. In such a process of an acute group spin, the group operates as a whole that is larger than its parts. Even if its individual members would not have committed the rape, their collective spin leads to an extreme escalation of violence. Research on members of youth gangs exhibiting chronic group spin patterns has also validated this claim, given that the extent of the offenses committed by the members had grown since they joined the gang.

In a similar vein, research on the Crime Contagion Models detected a criminal spin in an entire neighborhood to such an extent that the escalation of criminality was found to be greater than the other characteristics of the neighborhood's deterioration. Furthermore, one may detect a criminal spin even in larger entities, across cultures and social classes or even at a national level.

== Duration ==
Usually, if nothing interferes with the natural order of events, the criminal spin leads to a crisis that halts its movement, or reaches a peak and then subsides. The spin can also be brought to a halt by an external intervention. In the experience of the offender, the intervention necessary to stop the spin from escalating should be more powerful than the spin. While law enforcement and social systems might provide such an external intervention, they usually target only some of the characteristics of the criminal spin. Usually their influence is only short-term and limited to the acute criminal spin, and as such they fail to bring about a change that lasts. Therefore, it is necessary to generate a complementary transformation that can deeply influence the chronic spin. Positive criminology is a perspective that encompasses various models aimed at this objective.

Despite the lack of choice and loss of Self-control theory of crime depicted by the criminal spin model, the latter does not intend to remove the Moral responsibility from the agent, but to describe the phenomenological experience during the spin. It is only after the spin that individuals recall that they experienced a reduced sense of control, which made it difficult for them to stop it by themselves.

== Views and treatment ==
The phenomenological model of criminal spin allows us to analyze situations and behaviors in society, to examine whether they feature a process of criminal spin and to suggest how this spin may be stopped. As such, different interventions are necessary to stop acute versus chronic spin, and individual versus group spin.

== See also ==
- Broken windows theory
- Crime contagion model
- Pathological gambling

== Bibliography ==
- Ronel, N. (2009). The criminal spin. In K. Jaishankar (ed.), International perspectives on crime and justice (pp. 126–145). Newcastle upon Tyne, UK: Cambridge Scholars Publishing.
- Ronel, N. (2011). Criminal behavior, criminal mind: Being caught in a criminal spin. International Journal of Offender Therapy and Comparative Criminology, 55(8), 1208 - 1233.
- Ronel, N., & Segev, D. (2014). The “positive” can subside criminality: Growing out of a criminal spin by positive criminology approaches. In D. Polizzi, M. Braswell & M. Draper (eds.), Transforming Corrections: Humanistic Approaches to Corrections and Offender Treatment (2'nd edition)(pp. 229–246). Durham, North Carolina: Carolina Academic Press
- Bensimon, M., & Ronel, N. (2012). The flywheel effect of intimate partner violence: A victim-perpetrator interactive spin. Aggression and Violent Behavior, 17, 423–429.
- Bensimon, M., Baruch, A., & Ronel, N. (2013). The experience of gambling in an illegal casino: The gambling spin process. European Journal of Criminology, 10(1), 3–21.
- Zemel, O., Ronel, N., & Einat, T. (2015). The impact of introspection and resilience on abstention and desistance from delinquent behavior among adolescents at risk. European Journal of Criminology
