= Crime-Free Multi-Housing =

Crime prevention program

The Crime-Free Multi-Housing (CFMH) program is a crime-free ordinance program, which partners property owners, residents, and law-enforcement personnel in an effort to eliminate crime, drugs, and gang activity from rental properties.

== History ==
The program began in Mesa, Arizona in the United States in 1992. Since then, it has spread to other US cities and several other countries.

The International Crime Free Association reports potential benefits of the program, including tenant satisfaction and increased demand for rental units.

Additionally, there has been pushback against crime free ordinances. In federal lawsuits across the country, tenants, landlords, and the Department of Justice (DOJ) have challenged crime-free ordinances and their enforcement, citing violations of fair housing laws, equal protection, due process, and the First Amendment right to free association.

== Program ==
Three phases must be completed under police supervision:

- An eight-hour seminar presented by the local police department
- Certification that the rental property has met the security requirements for the tenants' safety
- A tenant crime-prevention meeting is held

Participating landlords have the option to display their certification status on their property.

== See also ==
- Crime prevention through environmental design
- Nuisance ordinance
- Eviction in the United States § Disproportionately impacted evictees
- Racial inequality in the United States § Housing
