= Nuisance ordinance =

Local law

A nuisance ordinance, also referred to as a crime-free ordinance or a disorderly house ordinance, is a local law usually passed on the town, city, or municipality level of government that aims to legally punish both landlords and tenants for crimes that occur on a property or in a neighborhood. These laws impose penalties under programs referred to as nuisance abatement when crimes are reported, regardless of whether crimes actually occurred or what the police action entailed. The result of these ordinances is for landlords to tell tenants to not report crimes, refuse to renew the lease of anyone involved in reporting a crime, and eviction of tenants involved in any crimes, even if the tenants were the victims of said crimes.

According to the American Civil Liberties Union (ACLU), while supporters of these ordinances argue that they prevent criminal activities in the areas under the ordinances, the actual result is instead a reduction in overall public safety and harm brought to victims of crime, particularly those suffering from domestic abuse, that are deterred from reporting the criminal activity committed against them. These ordinances have also been found to be disproportionately applied to people of color and communities that have a high minority population in general.

== Definitions ==
The original nuisance ordinances were derived from the common law system, where local governments employed prosecutions against individual citizens under the guise of the actions of said individuals hampering the "right common to the general public". These were then established into law with the creation of the legal term of nuisance. Later laws in the late 20th and into the 21st century would expand upon these laws for any desired usage of criminalizing activities by placing it under the same title of nuisance as a catch-all term. Because of this, what falls under the definition of nuisance is unclear within the legal system of any country with such a legal term and can be applied to multiple unrelated actions. However, these laws are always tried in criminal court and not civil court, making nuisance ordinance violations always a criminal act.

A variation of these ordinances are referred to legally as chronic nuisance ordinances, which are functionally identical to nuisance ordinances but allow a vague leeway of multiple "nuisance" charges being required before eviction is enacted. How many times are allowed varies between municipalities, along with whether they are applied to only rental properties or residential homes as well. Some versions of these ordinances also have a "buffer zone" determined around a residence that is considered a part of the property as well and any crimes committed within the bounds of that zone, even if the rental or home owner was uninvolved in the criminal incident, are used as a penalty against the owner.

== History ==
The laws for nuisance doctrines (or what was referred to as the "doctrine of private nuisance") were first recorded in England during the Middle Ages and were exclusively used to refer to someone who interfered with the owner of a piece of land from utilizing that land. Changes to the laws were made in the 13th and 14th centuries to also apply to any interference with land owned by the King of England, which included most public roads and other areas. Violations of these public locations were eventually made into a separate set of laws dubbed the "doctrine of public nuisance", with the only difference legally being whether a private citizen or the government is the prosecuting party.

The expansion of nuisance doctrines to include violations of anything deemed against the public order occurred over the following centuries, with the 18th century on seeing them applied commonly to prevent practices such as the sale of alcohol and prostitution. But modern implementations of the ordinances in the late 20th and 21st centuries have returned to the original subject of misuse of property, particularly under the type of housing that is leased. The current implementation of the ordinances first began being passed in the 1980s as a method to deter crimes involving the drug trade in various major cities. A federal United States law was first passed in 1986 as a part of the Anti-Drug Abuse Act of 1986 and was given the nickname of the "crackhouse statute" and which made landlords criminally liable if they rented housing units to anyone they knowingly understood to be trafficking in or using illegal drugs. This led to the first nuisance ordinance under the modern usage being passed in 1987 in Portland, Oregon, as a method to evict all of the tenants in claimed drug houses.

As of 2021, 37 out of the 40 largest cities in the United States have implemented some form of nuisance ordinance law, with more than half having eviction of the tenant as the penalty for violation and with 5 of the cities including calling for emergency services as a form of nuisance.

=== Legal cases ===
One of the earliest recorded cases in the United States to deal with a property nuisance ordinance law was Bouley v. Young-Sabourin in 2005 that involved a tenant being evicted after she called the police because of a domestic violence attack from her husband. The landlord then sent an eviction notice because calling the police was a violation of a provision within the lease contract that disallowed tenants from letting the premises be used for "unlawful purposes". The tenant argued in the case that, as a victim of domestic violence, eviction for being assaulted was a violation of non-discrimination law regarding sex-based protections. The court agreed with the argument from the tenant and ruled in her favor. Further cases involving domestic violence have used the case of Bouley v. Young-Sabourin as precedent in court filings involving nuisance ordinances and domestic abuse, such as in Meister v. Kansas City that also invoked the Violence Against Women Act. Many prosecutions by tenants in the years since have involved the ACLU settling the cases and pushing for stronger legislation against nuisance ordinances.

A letter of guidance by the United States Department of Housing and Urban Development was released in 2016 that specifically pointed out nuisance ordinances as a violation of the Fair Housing Act and of multiple laws on government requirements toward preventing domestic violence.

== Impacts and outcomes ==
A 2018 study by Mead et al. found that there are four primary kinds of crimes that are reported and then charged under nuisance ordinances: domestic violence, mental health crises, drug overdoses, and non-criminal activities such as children playing in the area around the property and being reported as nuisances. The study also found that housing that is commonly targeted by nuisance ordinances are those under a housing choice voucher program that allow for poorer residents to afford rent in higher income housing. These targeted tenants were also determined by Mead et al. to be commonly racial in nature, with municipality governments wanting to reduce the number of people of color and people with disabilities in the housing areas under their control. Jarwala and Singh (2019) found that not only is discrimination against people with disabilities likely severely underreported when it comes to nuisance ordinance evictions, but also that such tenants are more likely to require routine medical services because of their disabilities that can result in a nuisance charge against them.

A case study by Gretchen W. Arnold (2016) on the impact of nuisance ordinances on women undergoing domestic violence found that these laws reduced the health and safety of women in neighborhoods with such ordinances and significantly reduced the likelihood of the abuse victims calling emergency services. This not only caused an escalation in the level of abuse, but also reduced the safety and quality of the neighborhoods as a whole and resulted in greater criminal activity in the municipalities in question.
