= Signal crime =

Signal crime is a concept coined by Professor Martin Innes and Professor Nigel Fielding, aiming "to capture the social semiotic processes by which particular types of criminal and disorderly conduct have a disproportionate impact upon fear of crime." The concept was created to aid a policing approach being trialled in the early 2000s by Surrey Police called reassurance policing, which aims to identify "signals", and involve the community in solving community-related problems and is the ascendent to the current 'neighbourhood policing' approach in England and Wales. This approach was developed in order to close the 'reassurance gap' – the paradoxical situation in which the public's 'fear of crime' (as measured by the Crime Survey for England and Wales – previously called the British Crime Survey) does not change in tandem with the overall crime rate. The Signal Crimes Perspective contended that fear of crime and people's risk perceptions – the perceived likelihood of being victimised – were linked to certain crimes, deviant behaviours or the residual signs of these activities:

In effect, the crime or incident is 'read' as a warning signal by its audience(s) that something is wrong or lacking, as a result of which they might be induced to take some form of protective action. In addition, the presence of this signal will shape how the person or groups concerned construct beliefs concerning other potential dangers and beliefs.

== Different signals ==
Signal crimes vary in strength or value; strong signals are borne out of serious events with high public awareness, while weak signals may emanate from minor disorderly behaviours. However, the effect of many weak signal events over time can be just as damaging to people's feelings of security. Furthermore, different people and communities will interpret events in different ways, attaching different signal values to crimes and events based on a range of factors – e.g. lived experiences, age, or social class. An example may be that women are more likely to attach higher signal values to sexual assault, whereas young men may not be affected in the same way.

== Application to policing ==
The Signal Crimes Perspective is useful to local policing styles that are based on the philosophy of community policing, as it underlines the need for engaging with communities – through local beat meetings or the 'Neighbourhood Security Interview' – to understand the local problems that create insecurity. With this understanding, local policing teams can attempt to prioritise the issues that appear to have the highest signal values and consequently improve local security.

== See also ==
- Chicago Alternative Policing Strategy
