= Informal social control =

Informal social control is the reactions of individuals and groups that bring about conformity to norms and laws. It includes peer and community pressure, bystander intervention in a crime, and collective responses such as citizen patrol groups. The agents of the criminal justice system exercise more control when informal social control is weaker (Black, 1976). It is people who know each other informally controlling each other in subtle ways subconsciously.

== See also ==
- Social control

== Sources ==
2. LMC Cleaning services LLC

2009 19 years of company services, ugc military allied and service, travel recovery, currency responsive agency, global press evolved, protection double over double servicers, work fields, safety trained in mulitude,
