= Panopticon (disambiguation) =

The Panopticon is a prison design by Jeremy Bentham (1786).

Panopticon may also refer to:

== Buildings ==
- Britannia Panopticon or The Panopticon, names for the Britannia Music Hall, Glasgow, Scotland
- Panopticons, an arts and regeneration project to construct landmarks in East Lancashire, England

== Music ==
- Panopticon (band), an American black metal/bluegrass project created by Austin Lunn
- Panopticon (album), by Isis, 2004
- "Panopticon" (song), by Smashing Pumpkins, 2012
- Panopticom, by Peter Gabriel, 2023

== Other uses ==
- Panopticon (film), a 2024 Georgian drama film
- The Panopticon (novel), a novel by Jenni Fagan
- Panopticon Software, a data visualization software company
- Panopticon, a book for the Eclipse Phase role playing game
- The Panopticon Chamber, a location on the planet Gallifrey in the science fiction series Doctor Who

== See also ==
- Argus Panoptes, a Greek mythological name
- Panopticism, a social theory developed by Michel Foucault
- Banopticon
- Opticon (disambiguation)
