= Opticon =

Opticon may refer to:

== In business ==
- Opticon (conference), an annual user conference organized by Optimizely
- OptiCon, an annual conference organized by the American Board of Opticianry
- Opticon is a traffic signal preemption system from Global Traffic Technologies.

== In music ==
- Opticon, a single from released by the band Orgy in 2000

== In publishing ==
- Opticon (typeface), a typeface developed for newspapers in 1935

== See also ==
- Panopticon (disambiguation)
