= Argus Panoptes =

Giant in Greek mythology

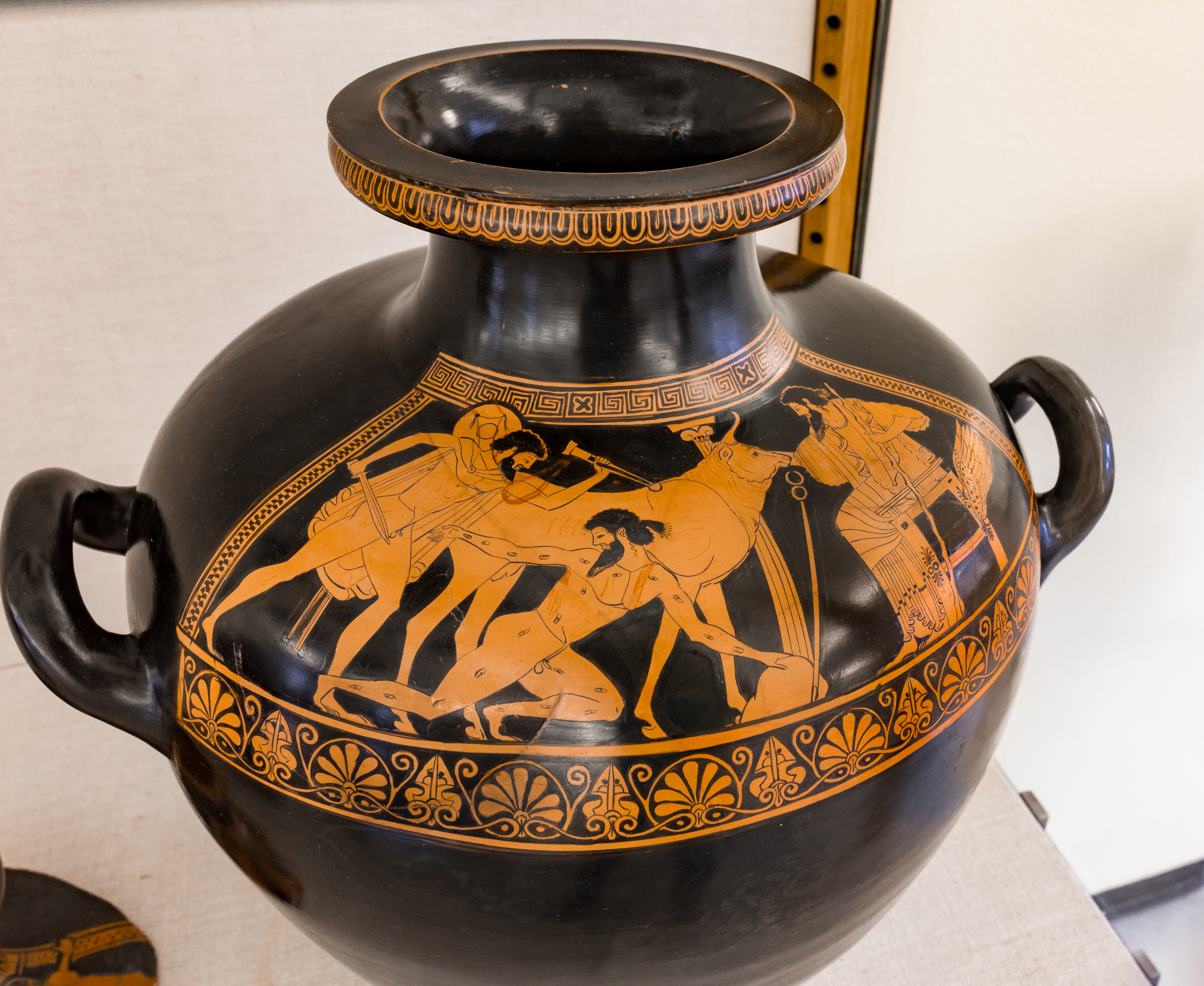
Hermes killing Argus on an Attic red-figure hydria by the Eucharides Painter, ca. 490 BC, Martin von Wagner Museum.

Argus or Argos Panoptes (Ancient Greek: Ἄργος Πανόπτης, "All-seeing Argos") is a many-eyed giant, son of Gaia, in Greek mythology. Known for his perpetual vigilance, he served the goddess Hera as a watchman. His most famous task was guarding Io, a priestess of Hera, whom Zeus had transformed into a heifer. Argus's constant watch, with some of his eyes always open, made him a formidable guardian. His eventual slaying by Hermes, on Zeus's orders, is a prominent episode in the myths surrounding him, and his eyes were then incorporated into the peacock's tail by Hera in his honor.

== Mythology ==
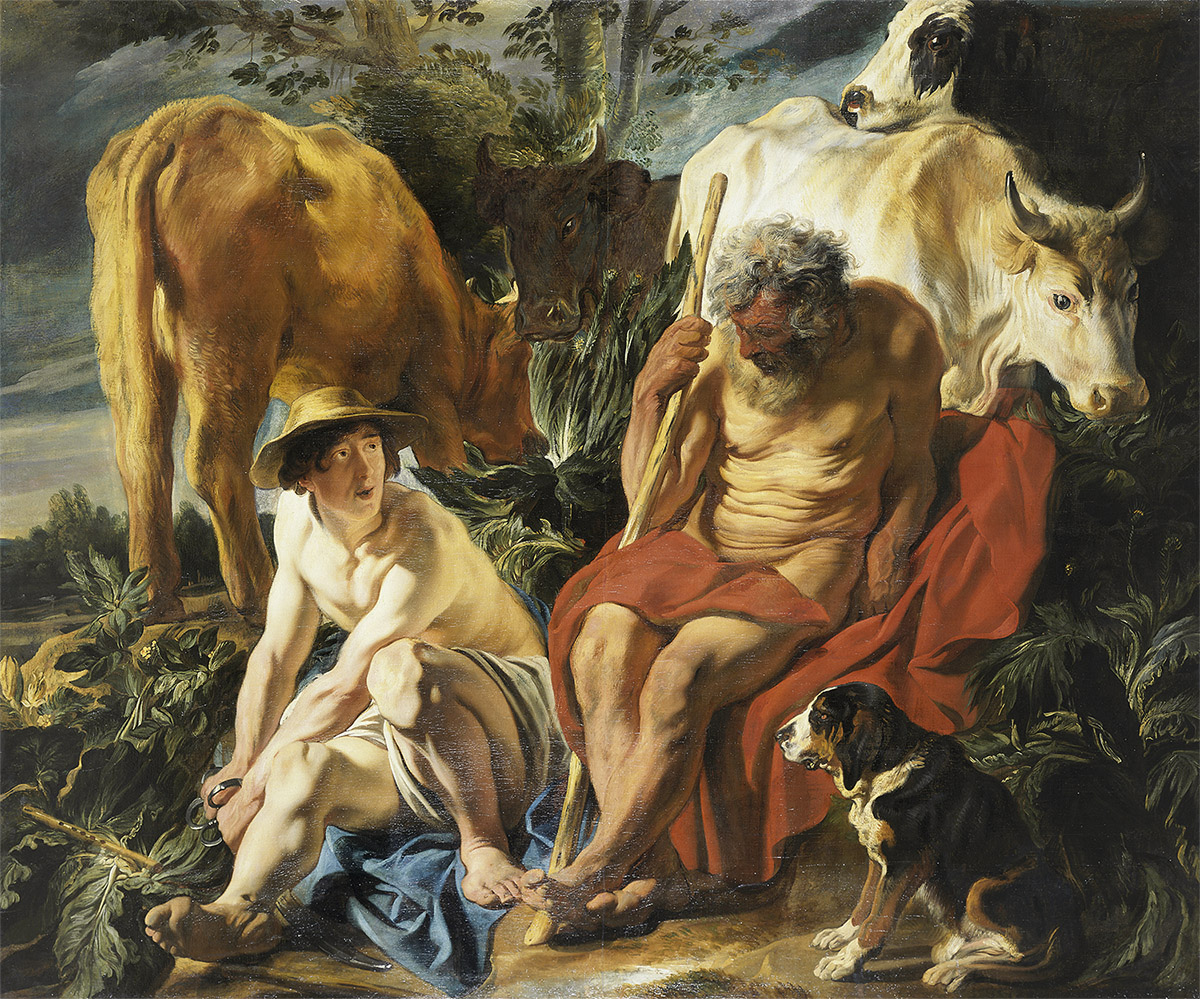
Mercury and Argus, by Jacob Jordaens, c. 1620 – Museum of Fine Arts of Lyon

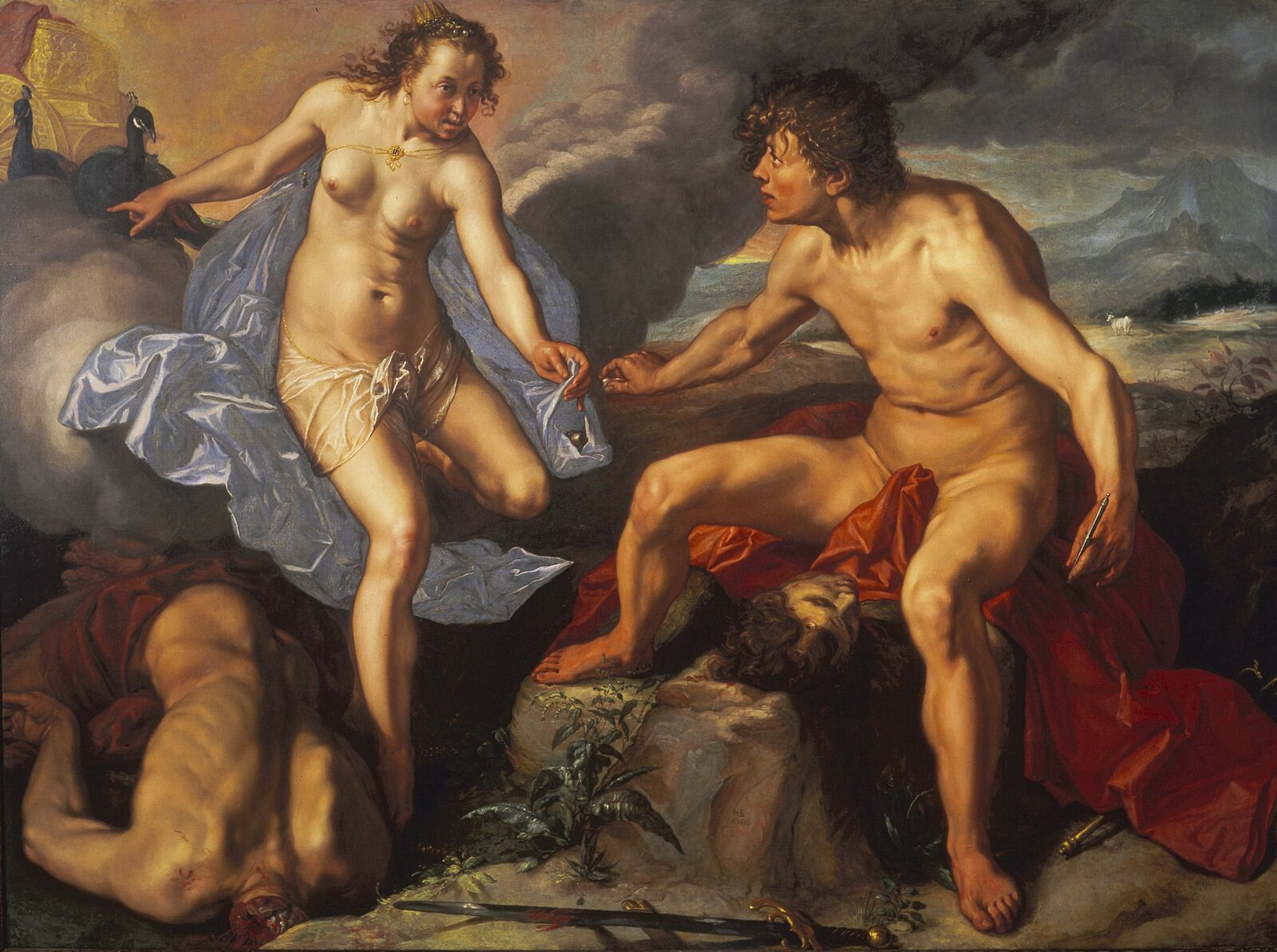
Juno receiving the eyes of Argus from Mercury by Hendrik Goltzius (1615), Museum Boijmans Van Beuningen

Argus Panoptes (Ἄργος Πανόπτης) was the guardian of the heifer-nymph Io and the son of Arestor. According to Asclepiades, Argus Panoptes was a son of Inachus, and according to Cercops he was a son of Argus and Ismene, daughter of Asopus. Acusilaus says that he was earth-born (autochthon), born from Gaia. Probably Mycene (in another version the son of Gaia) was a primordial giant whose epithet Panoptes, "all-seeing", led to his being described with multiple, often one hundred eyes. The epithet Panoptes was applied to the god of the Sun, Helios, and was taken up as an epithet by Zeus, Zeus Panoptes. "In a way," Walter Burkert observes, "the power and order of Argos the city are embodied in Argos the neatherd, lord of the herd and lord of the land, whose name itself is the name of the land."

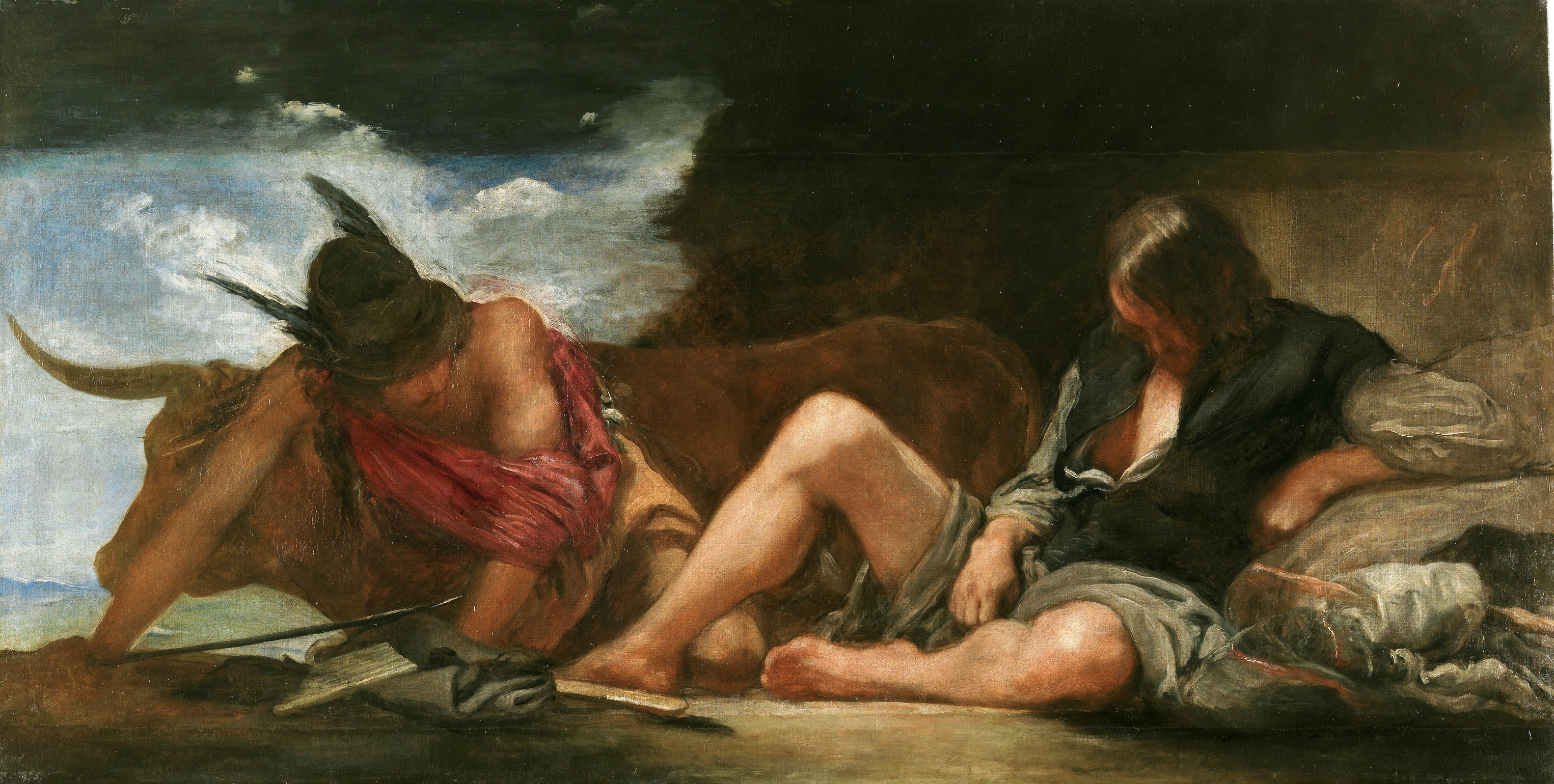
Hermes and Argus: Velázquez renders the theme of stealth and murder in modern dress, 1659 (Prado)

The epithet Panoptes, reflecting his mythic role, set by Hera as a very effective watchman of Io, was described in a fragment of a lost poem Aigimios, attributed to Hesiod:

And set a watcher upon her, great and strong Argus, who with four eyes looks every way. And the goddess stirred in him unwearying strength: sleep never fell upon his eyes; but he kept sure watch always.

In the 5th century and later, Argus's wakeful alertness was explained for an increasingly literal culture as his having so many eyes that only a few of the eyes would sleep at a time: there were always eyes still awake. In the 2nd century AD Pausanias noted at Argos, in the temple of Zeus Larissaios, an archaic image of Zeus with a third eye in the center of his forehead, allegedly Priam's Zeus Herkeios purloined from Troy.

Argus was Hera's servant. His great service to the Olympian pantheon was to slay the chthonic serpent-legged monster Echidna as she slept in her cave. Hera's defining task for Argus was to guard the white heifer Io from Zeus, who was attracted to her, keeping her chained to the sacred olive tree at the Argive Heraion. She required someone who had at least a hundred eyes spread out, always watching in all directions, someone who would stay awake despite being asleep. Argos was meant to be the perfect guardian. She charged him to "Tether this cow safely to an olive-tree at Nemea". Hera knew that the heifer was in reality Io, one of the many nymphs Zeus was coupling with to establish a new order. To free Io, Zeus had Argus slain by Hermes. The messenger of the Olympian gods, disguised as a shepherd, first put all of Argus' eyes asleep with spoken charms, then slew him. Some versions say that Hermes used his wand to close Argus' eyes permanently, while other versions say that Hermes simply hurled a stone at Argus. Either way, Argus' death was the first stain of bloodshed among the new generation of gods. After beheading Argus, Hermes acquired the epithet Argeiphontes or “Argus-slayer”.

The sacrifice of Argus liberated Io and allowed her to wander the earth, although tormented by a gadfly sent by Hera, until she reached the Ionian Sea, named after her, from where she swam to Egypt and gave birth to a love child of Zeus, according to some versions of the myth.

According to Ovid, Argus had a hundred eyes. Hera had Argus' hundred eyes preserved forever in a peacock's tail so as to immortalise her faithful watchman. In another version, Hera transformed the whole of Argus into a peacock.

The myth makes the closest connection of Argus, the neatherd, with the bull. According to the mythographer Apollodorus, Argus, "being exceedingly strong ... killed the bull that ravaged Arcadia and clad himself in its hide".

== Eponyms ==
Argus Panoptes is referenced in the scientific names of at least eight animals, each of which bears a pattern of eye spots: reptiles Cnemaspis argus, Eremias argus, Sibon argus, Sphaerodactylus argus, and the Argus monitor Varanus panoptes; the pheasant Argusianus argus; the fish Cephalopholis argus and the cowry Arestorides argus.

== Gallery ==
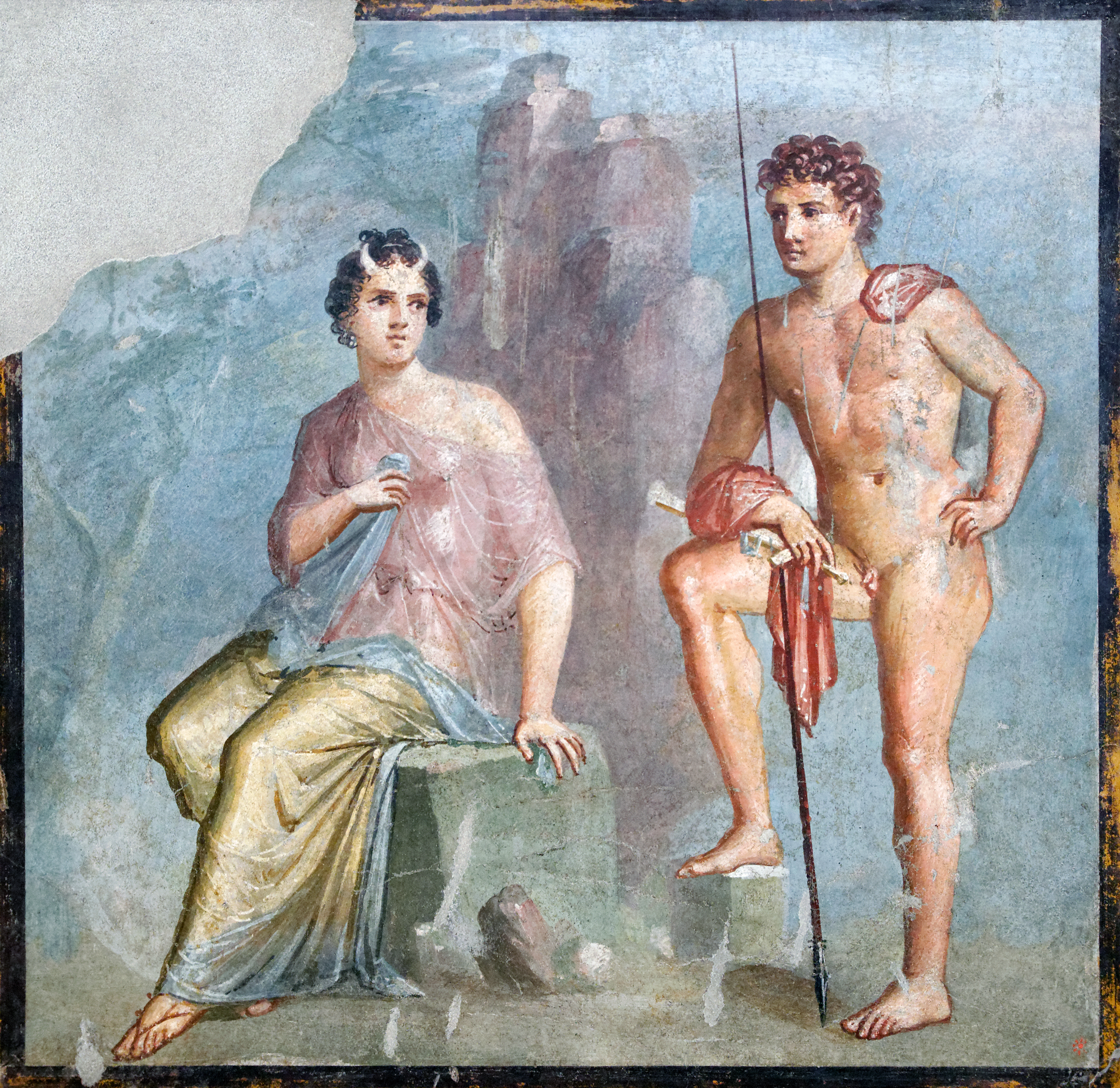
Io wearing bovine horns watched over by Argos on Hera's orders, antique fresco from Pompeii

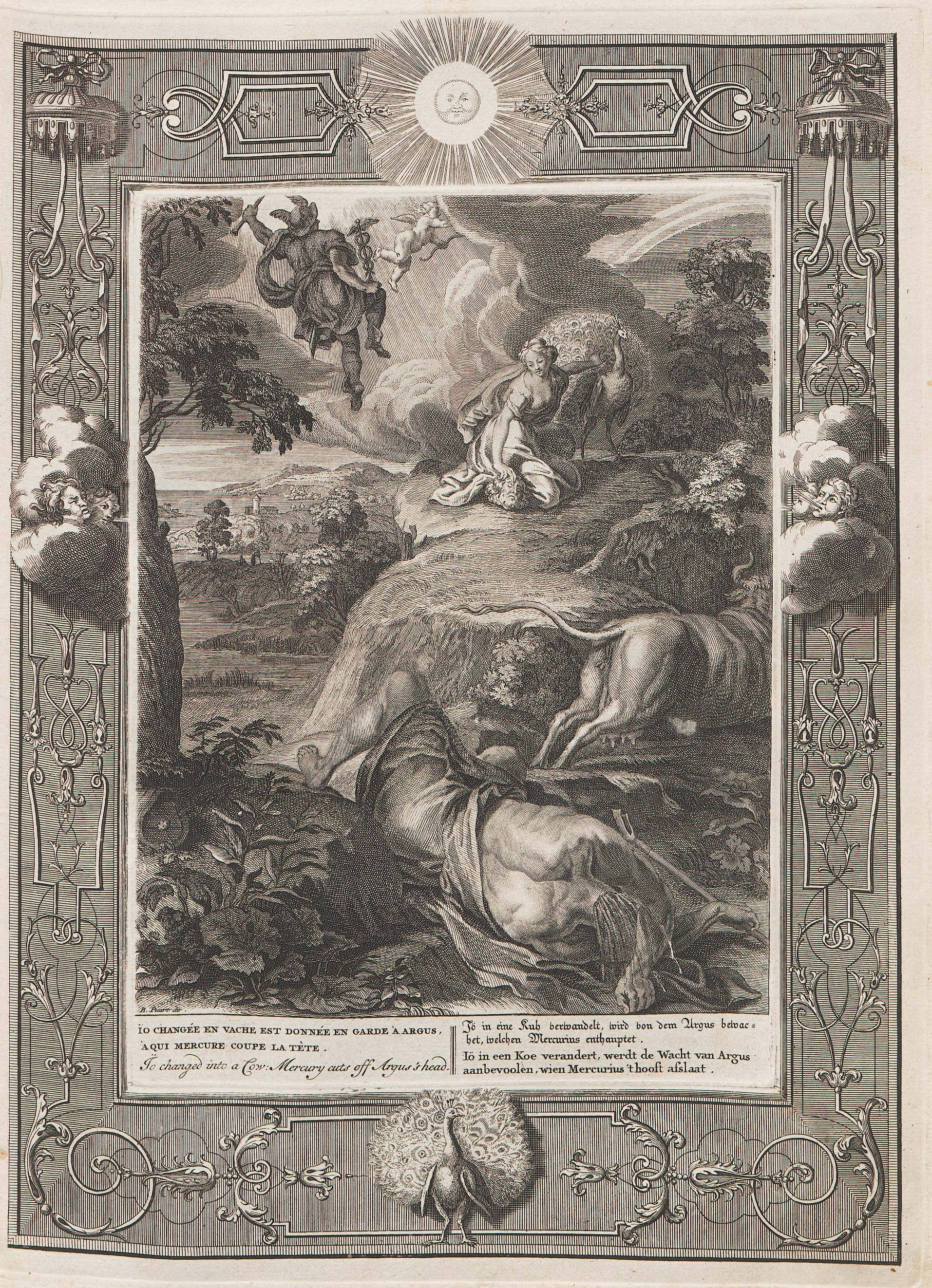
Io changed into a cow, Mercury cuts off Argus' head by Bernard Picart (1733)

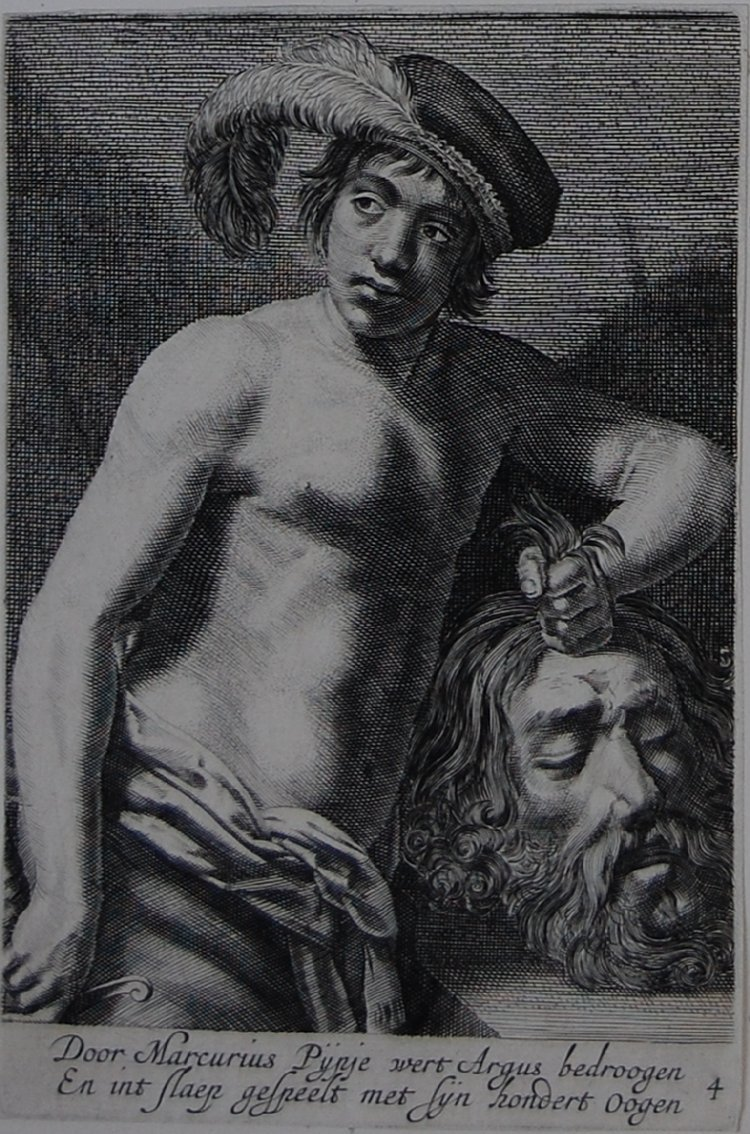
Mercurius and Argus by Jan van de Velde (1615–1641)

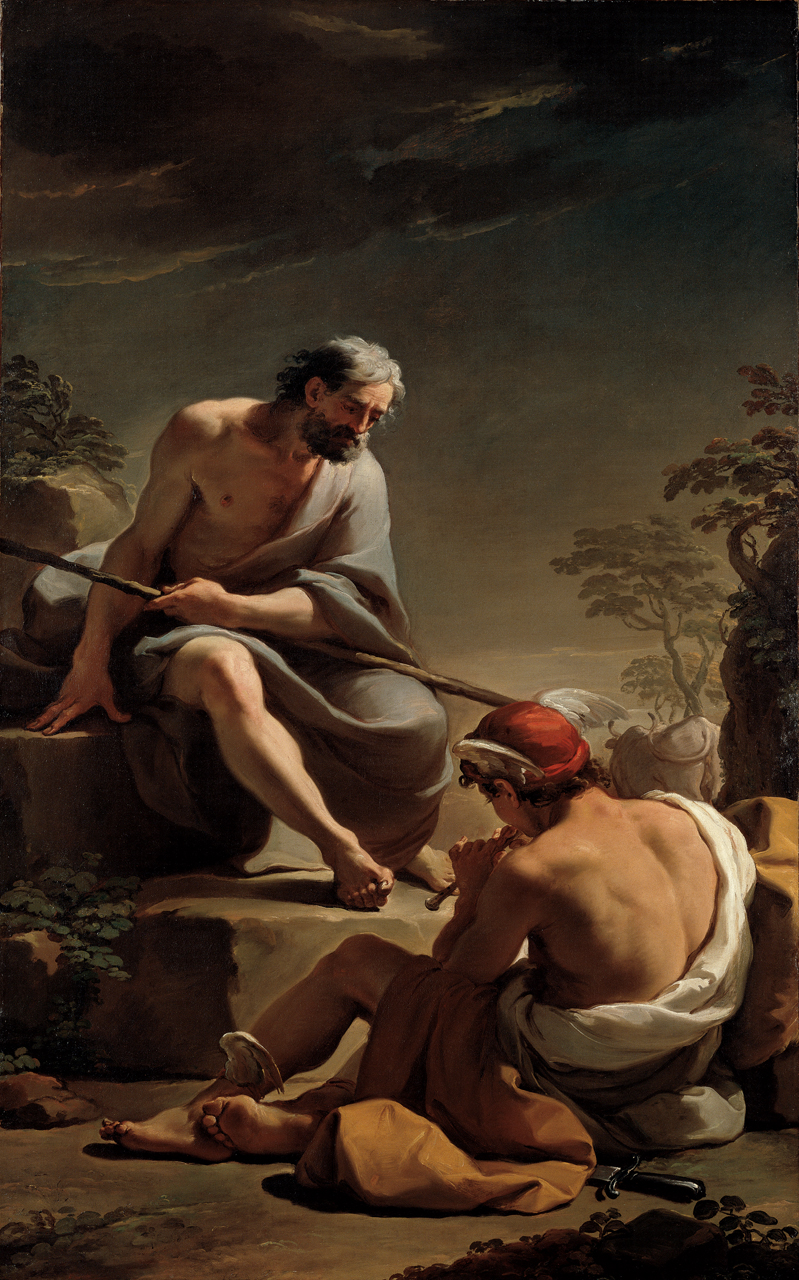
Mercury Lulling Argus to Sleep by Ubaldo Gandolfi (c. 1770–1775)

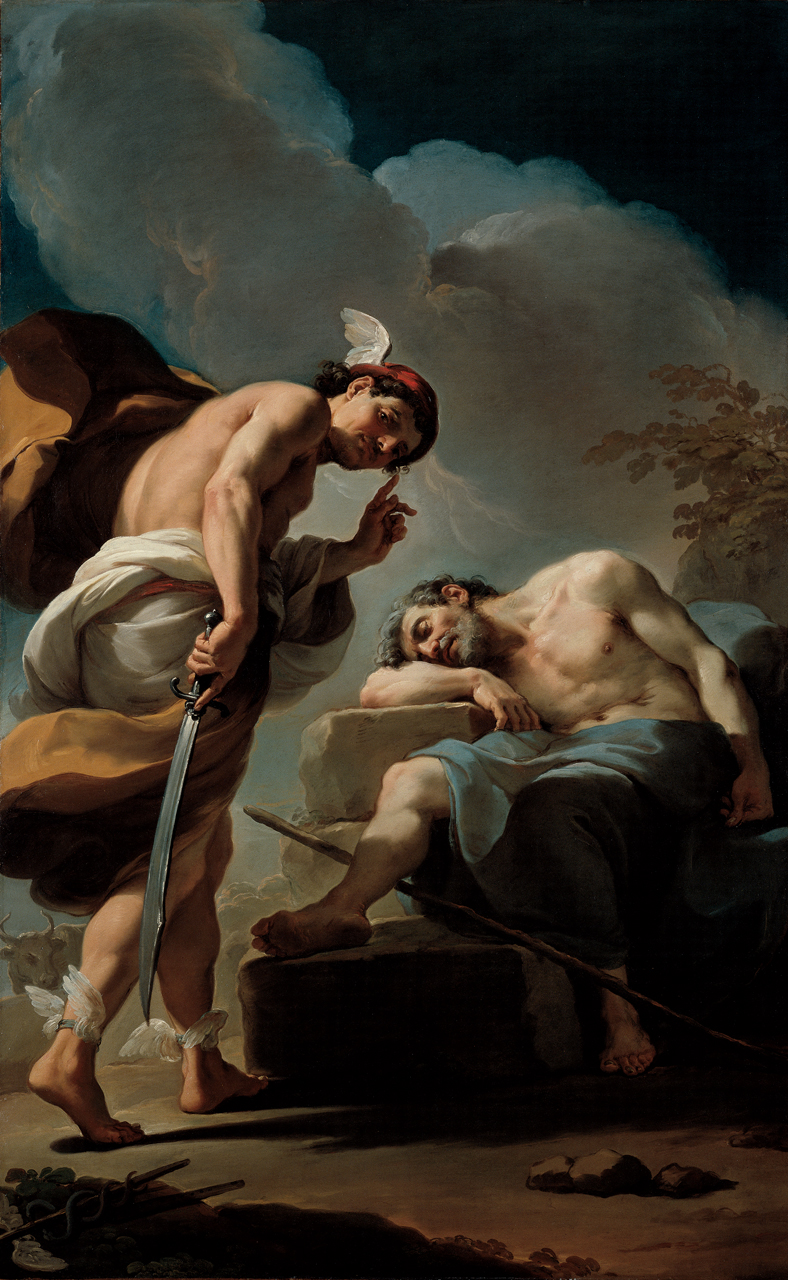
Mercury About to Behead Argus by Ubaldo Gandolfi (c. 1770–1775)

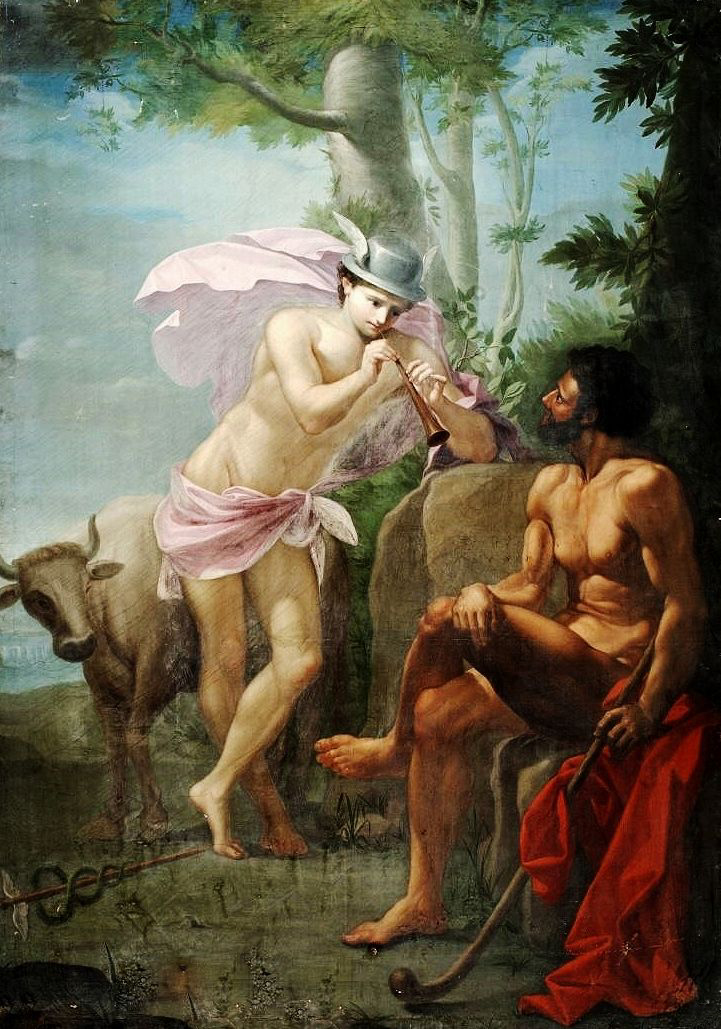
Mercury and Argus Alejandro de la Cruz(1773)

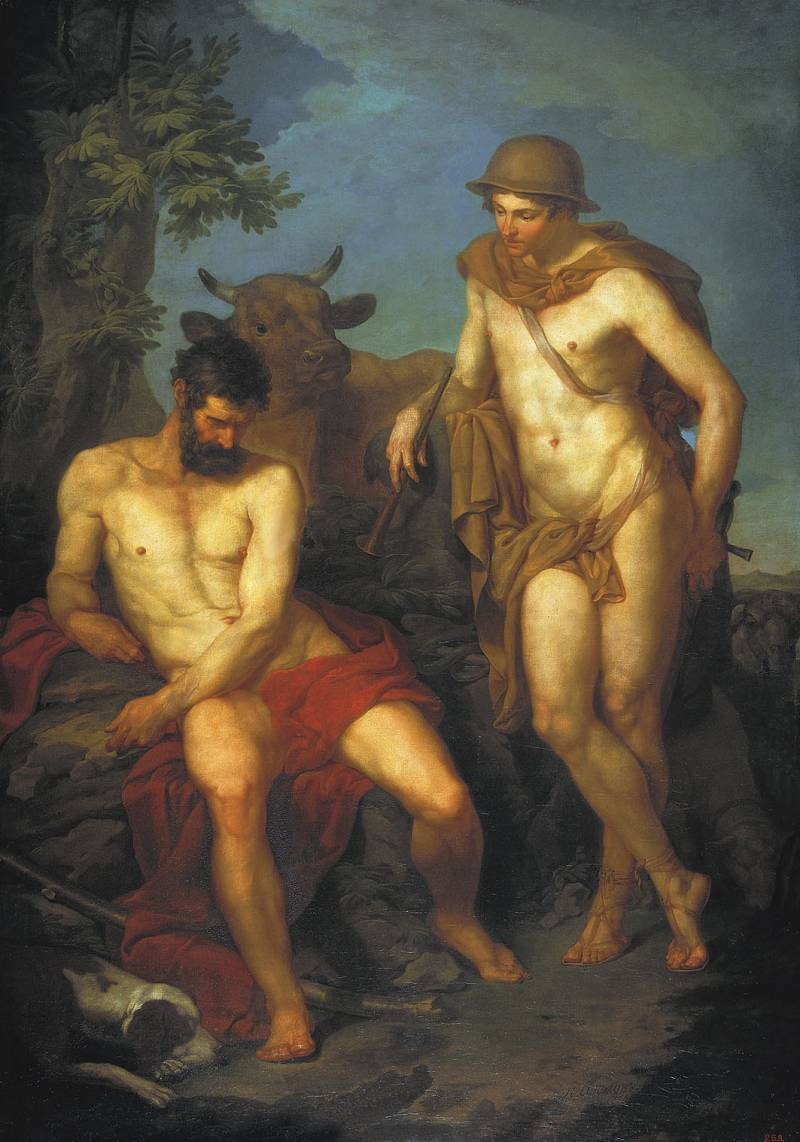
Mercury and Argus by Petr Ivanov (1776)

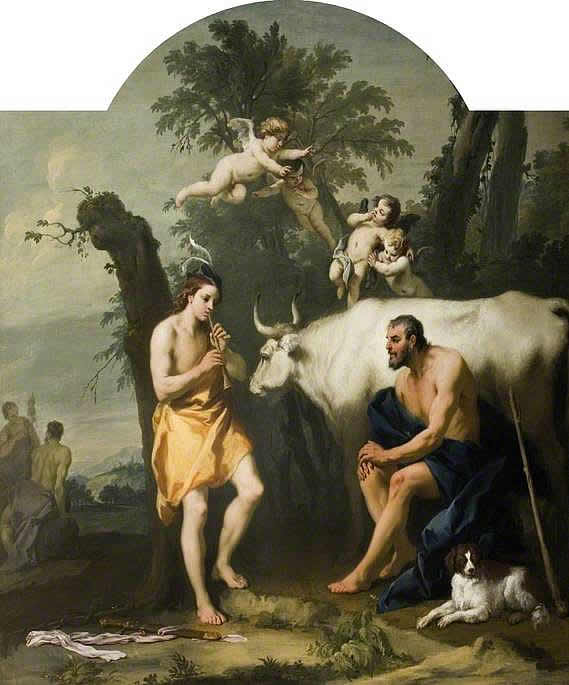
Argus Guarding Io Who Has Been Transformed into a White Heifer Jacopo Amigoni (18th century)

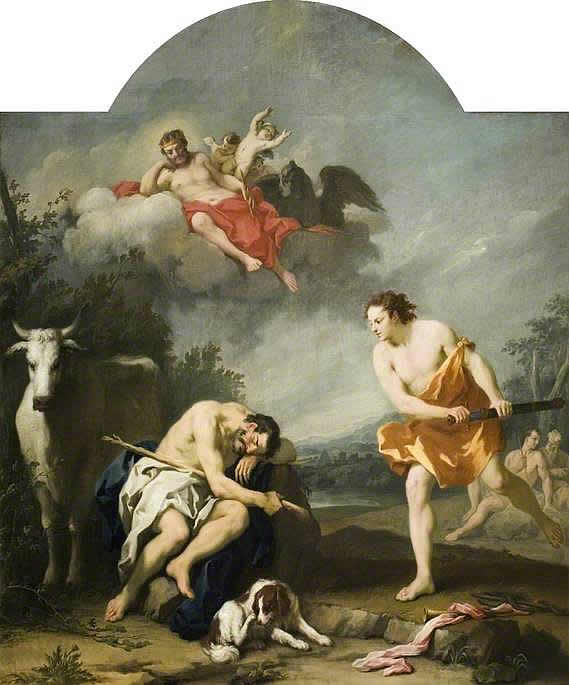
Mercury about to Kill Argus Having Lulled Him to Sleep by Jacopo Amigoni (18th-century)

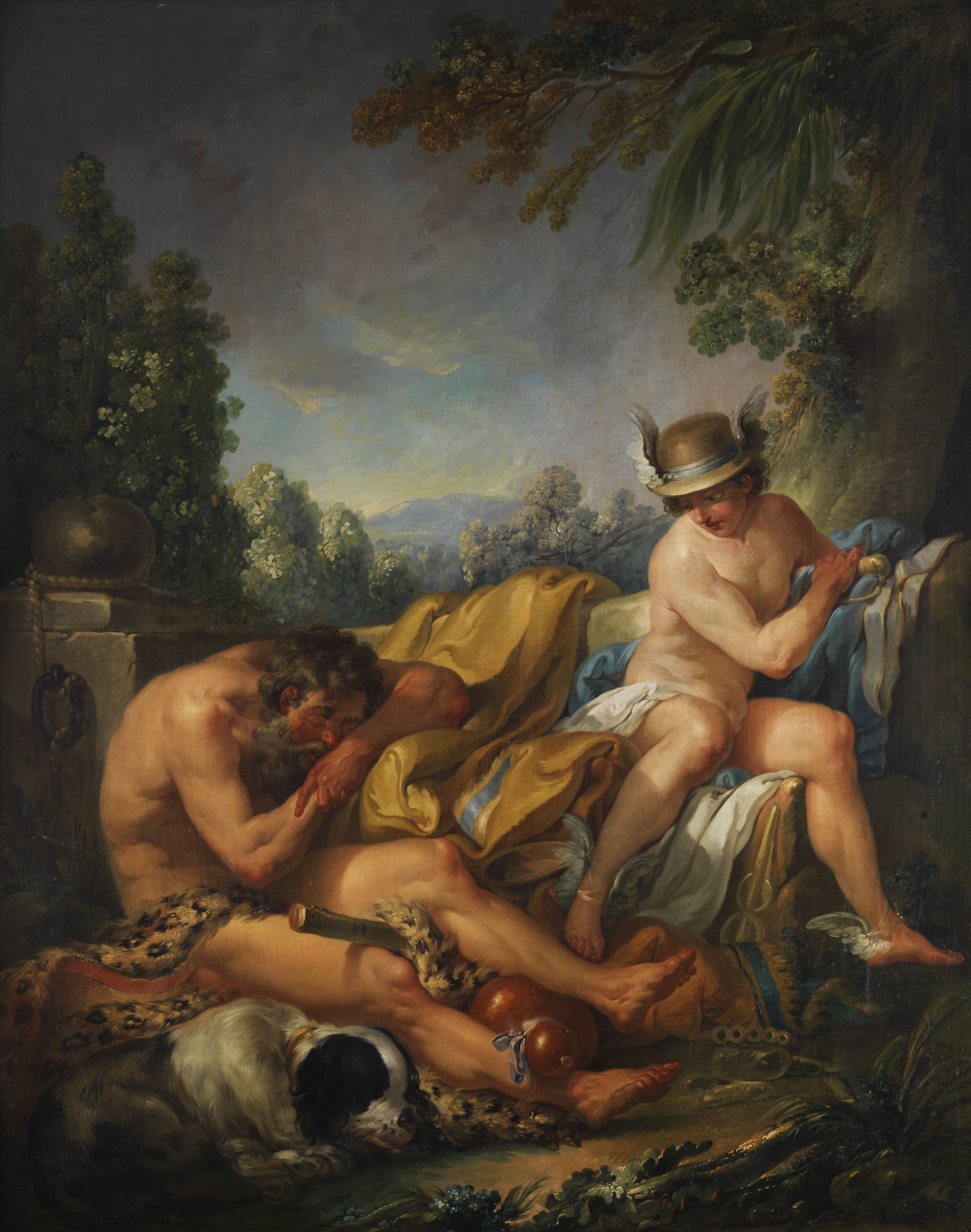
Merkur und Argus by Charles-André van Loo (18th century)

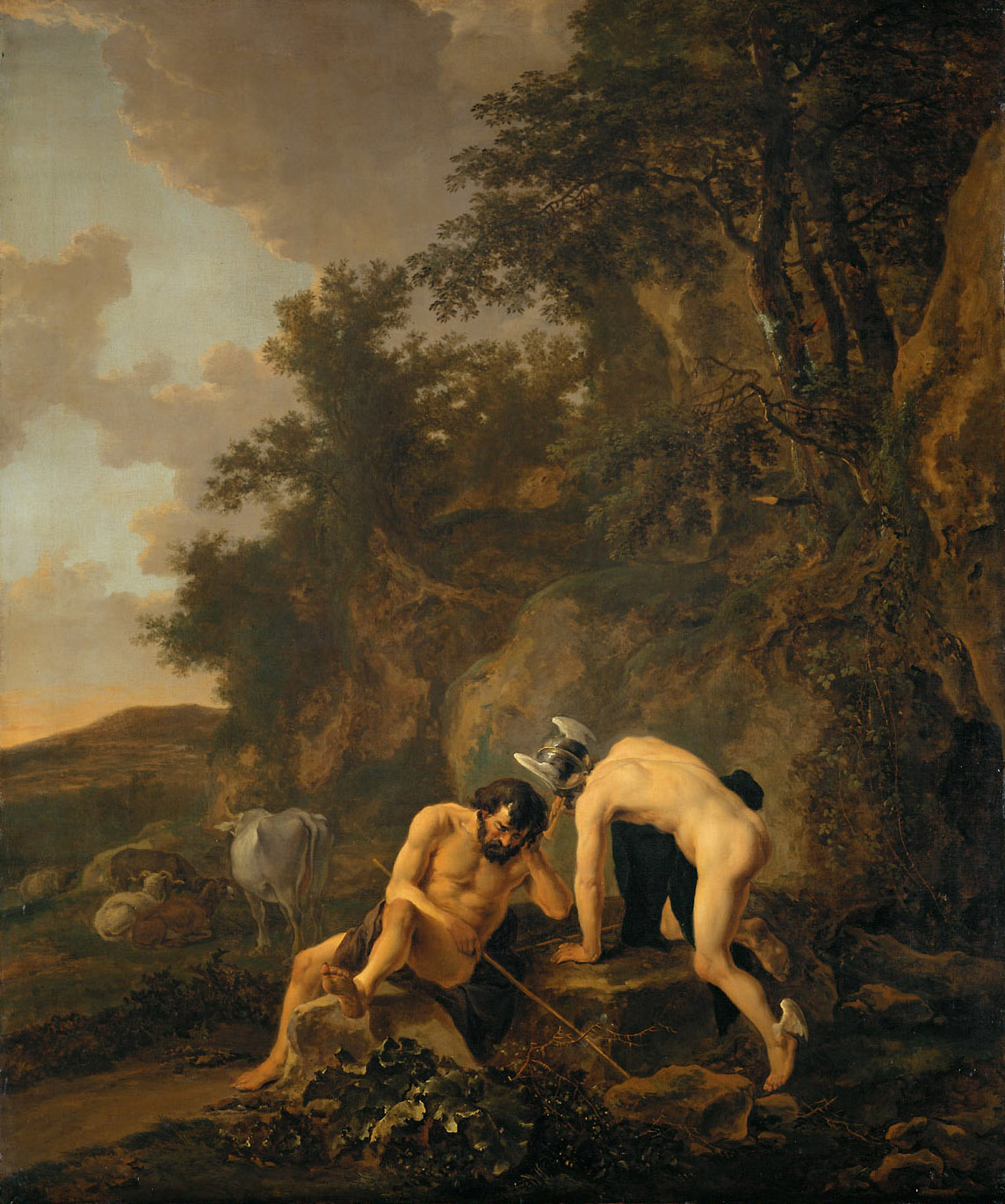
Landscape with Mercury and Argus by Jan Both (c. 1650)

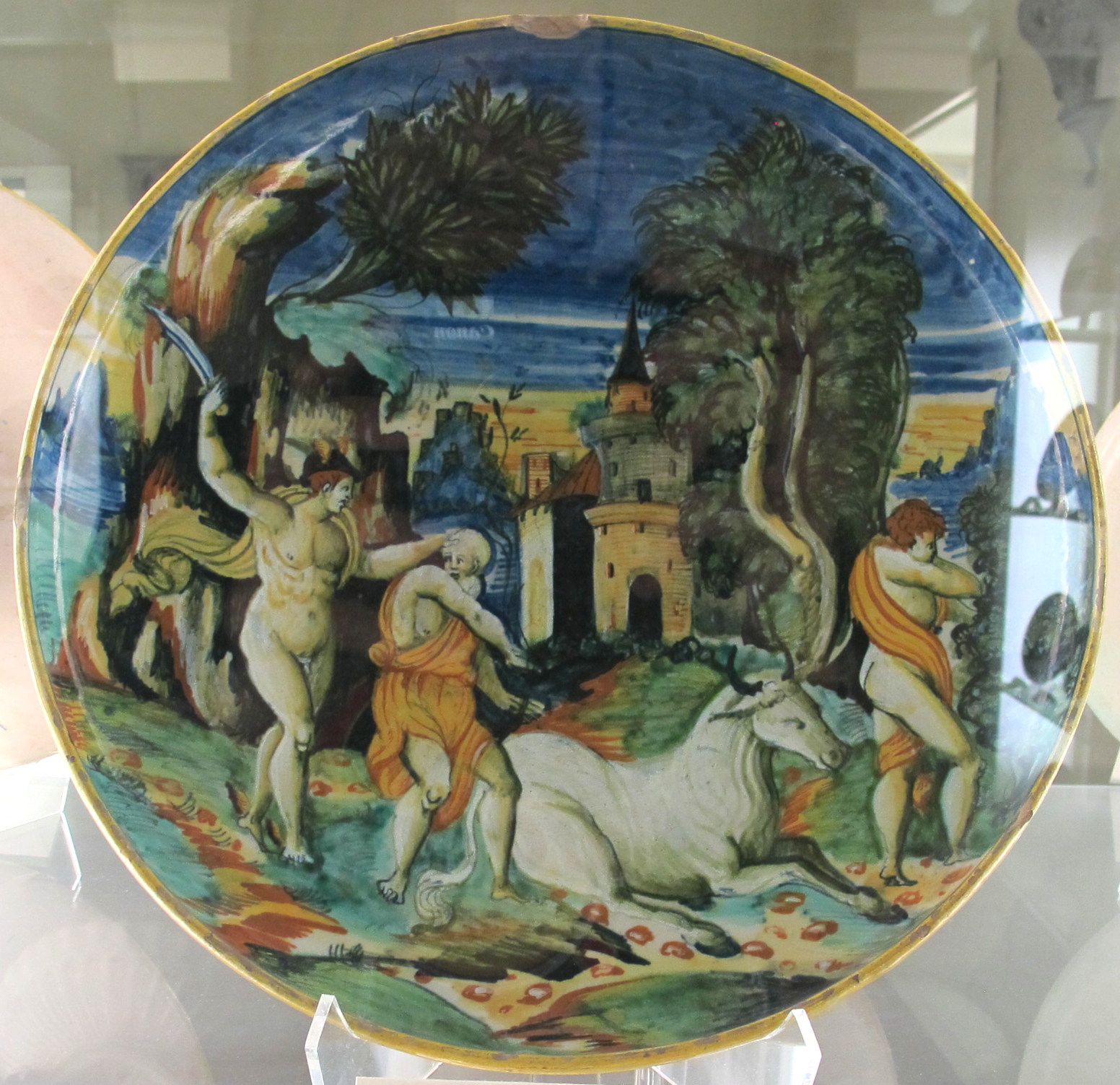
Mercury and Argus

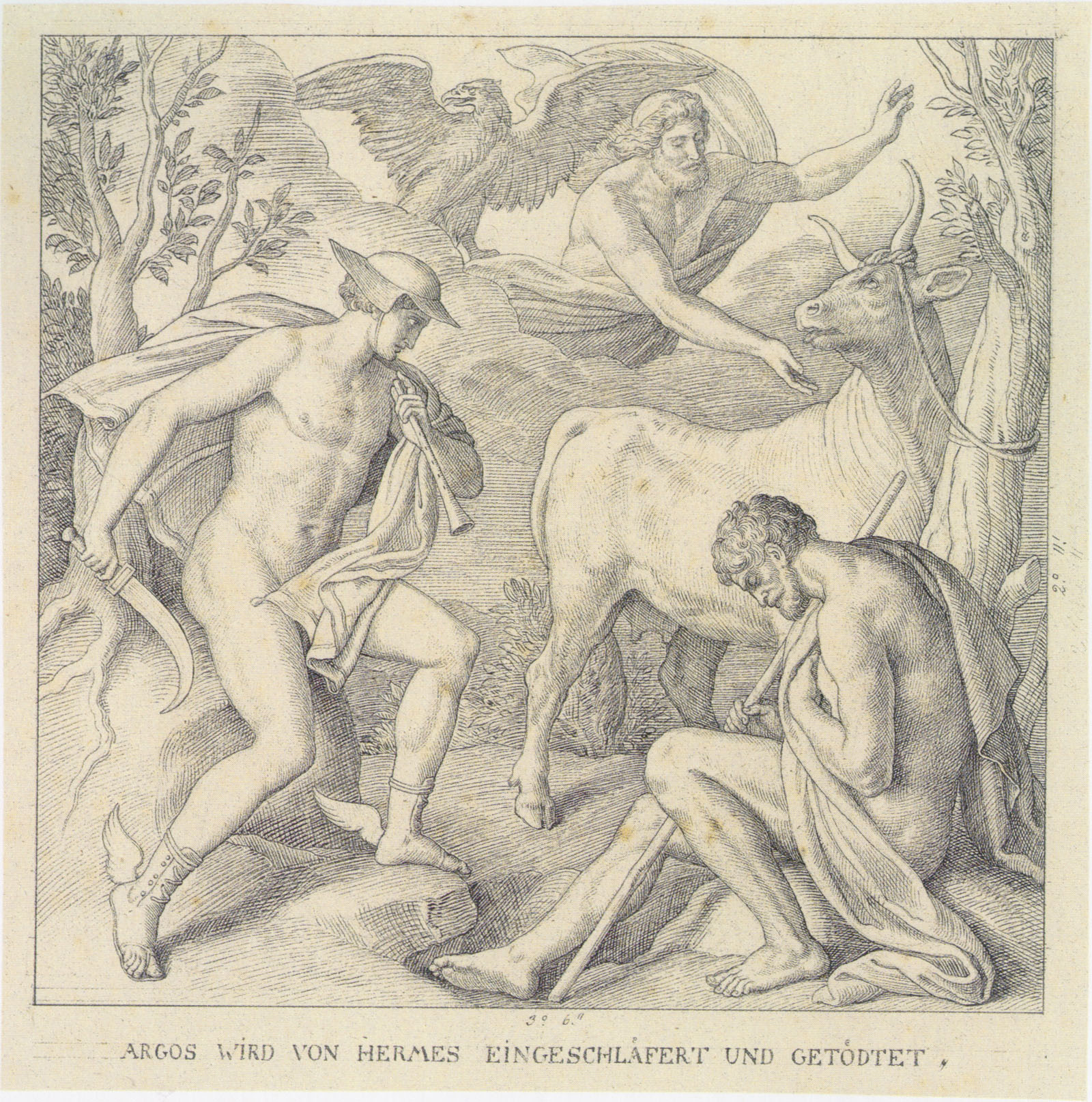
Argos wird von Hermes by Julius Schnorr von Carolsfeld (1794–1872)

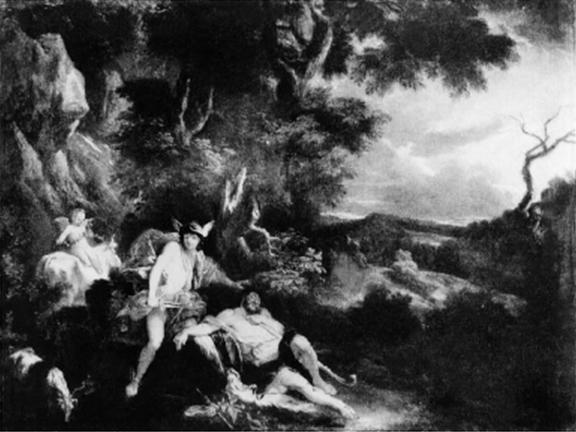
Mercury killing Argus by Nicolas Bertin (1700s)

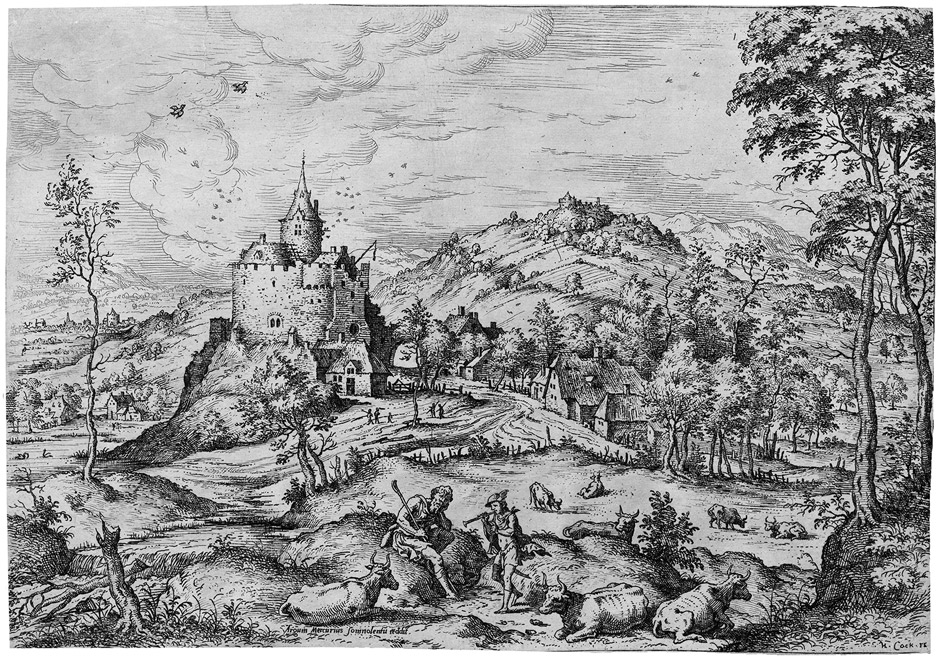
Die Landschaft mit Merkur und Argus by Hieronymus Cock (c. 1558)

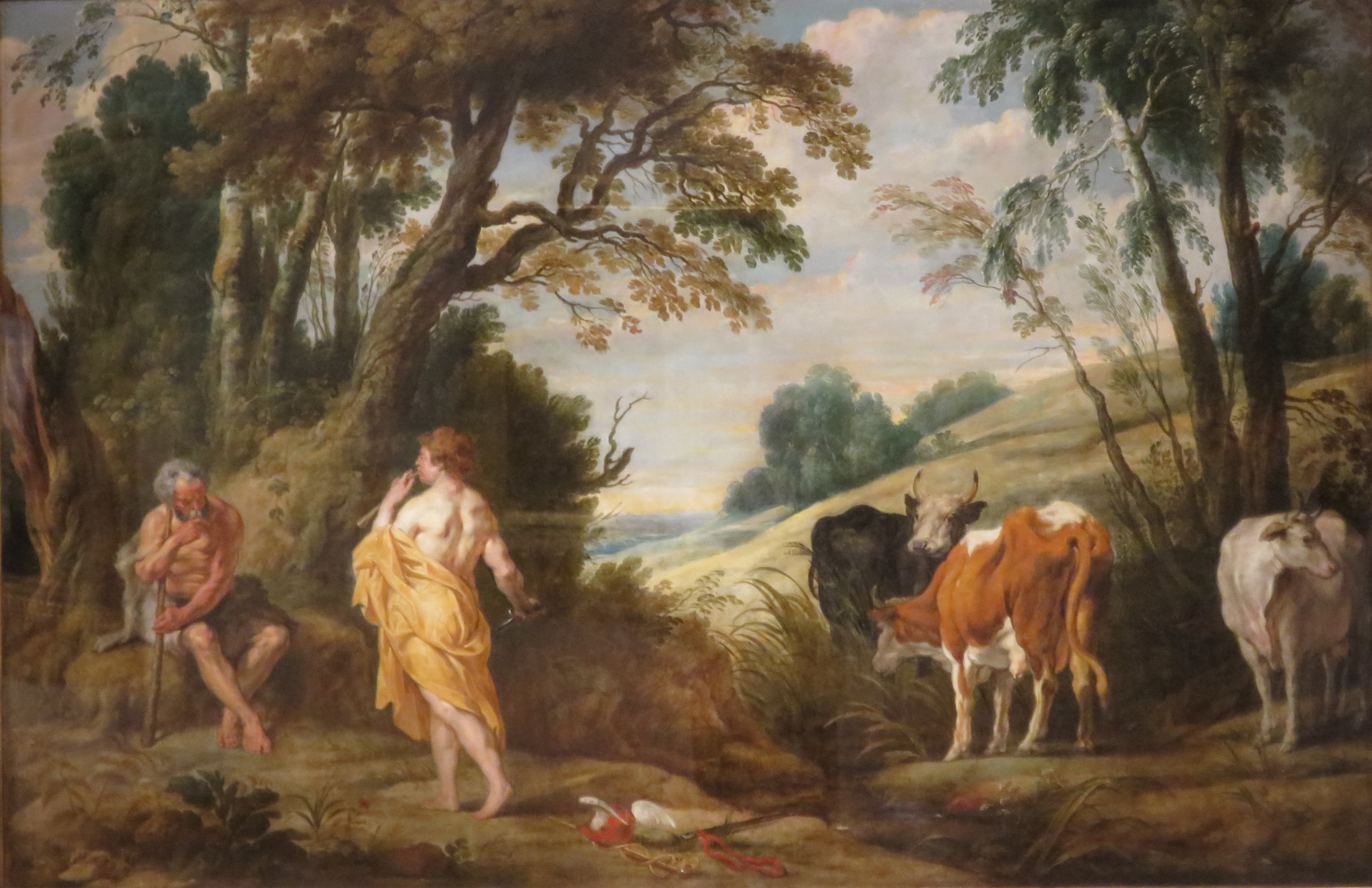
Mercury and Argus by Jacob Jordaens and Jan Wildens (c. early 1640s)

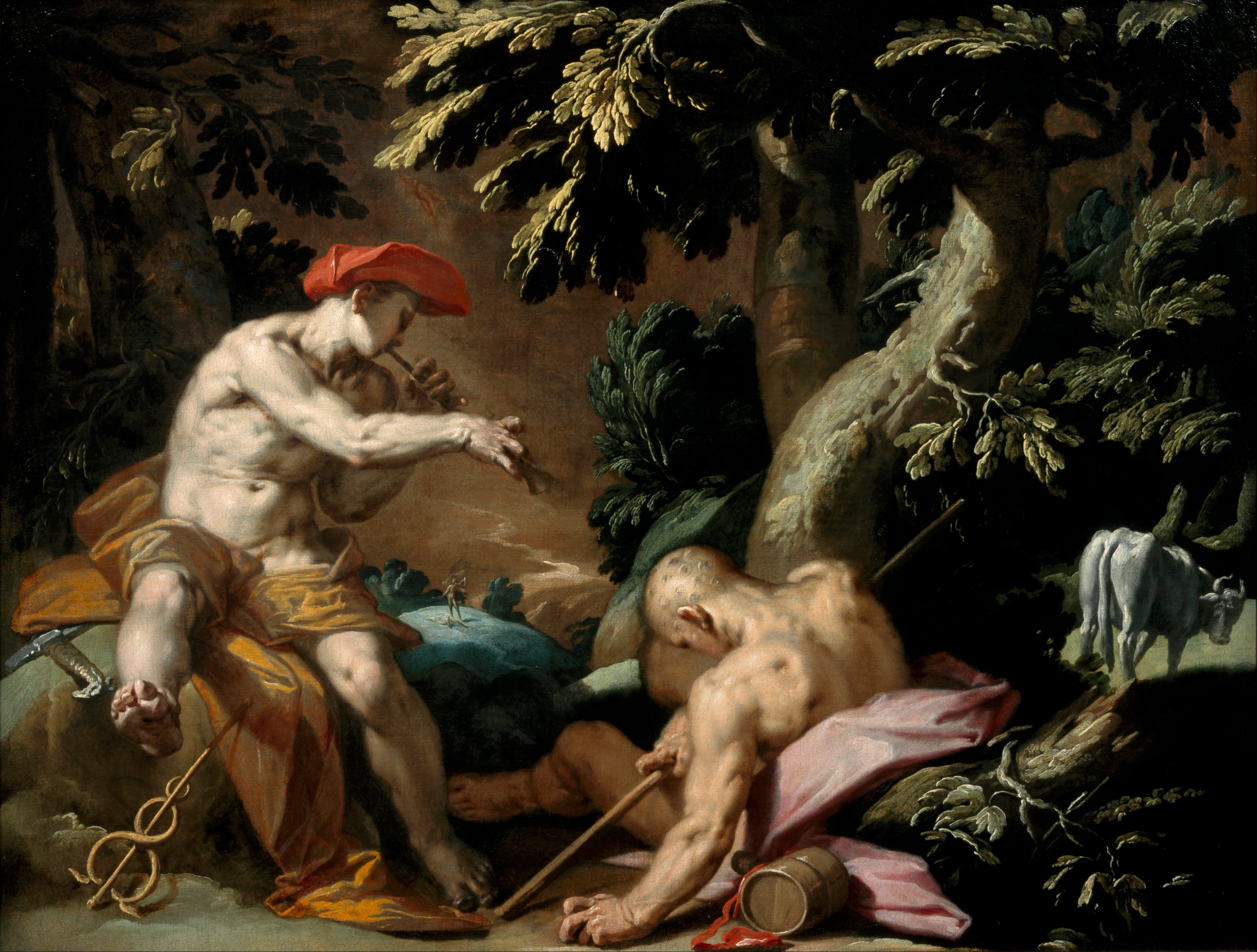
Mercury, Argus and Io by Abraham Bloemaert (c. 1592)

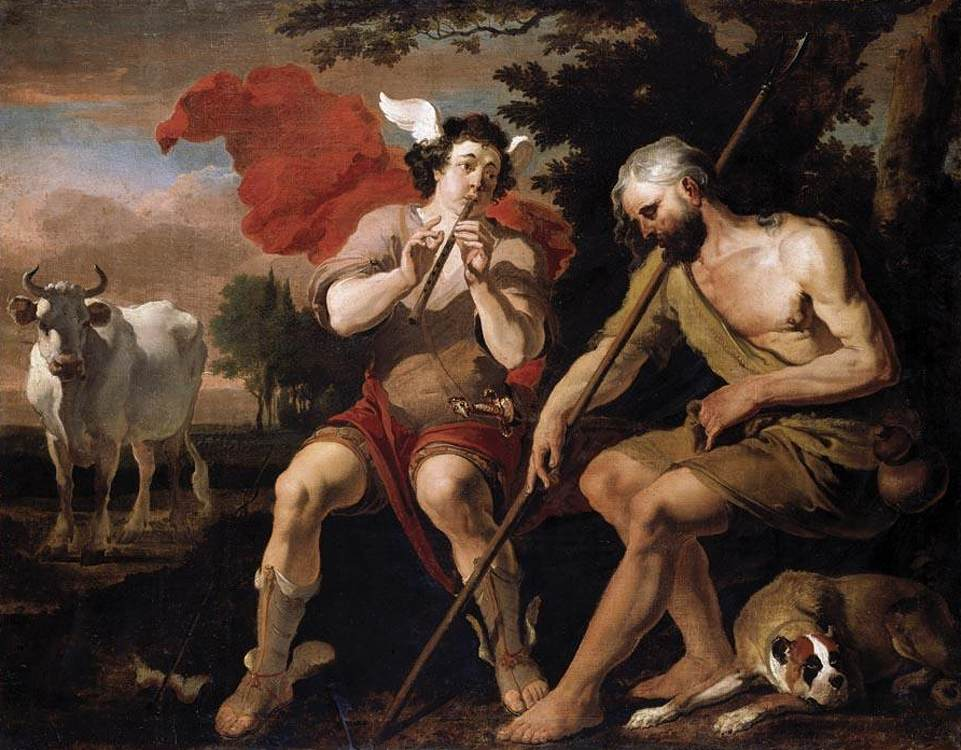
Mercury and Argos by Abraham Hondius (2nd half of 17th century)

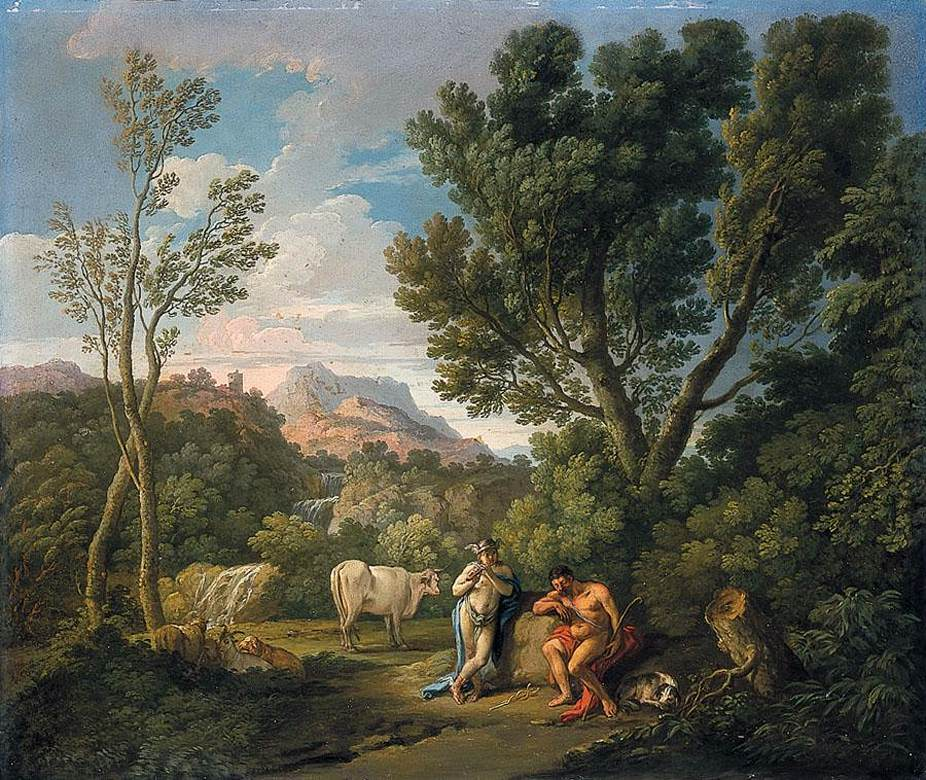
Mercury and Argus by Andrea Locatelli (1st half of 18th century)

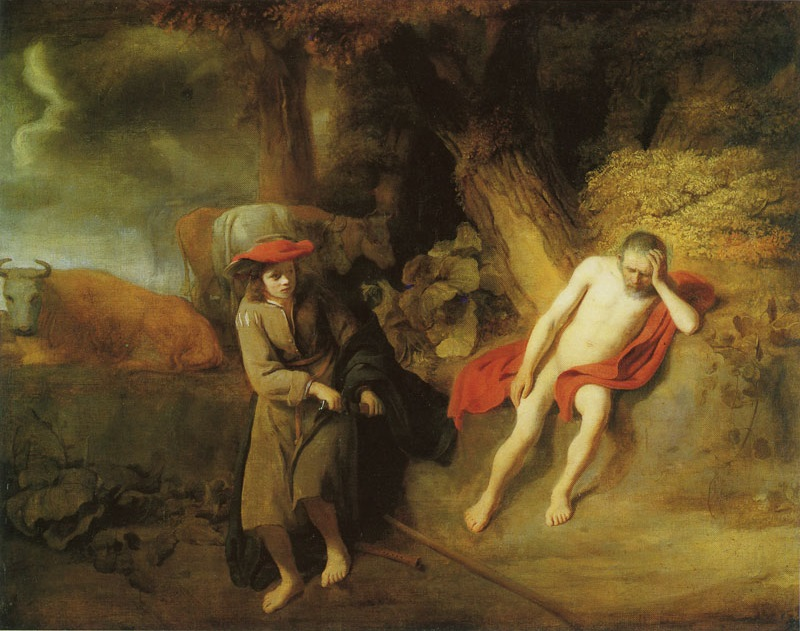
Mercurius, Argus and Io by Cornelis Bisschop (17th century)

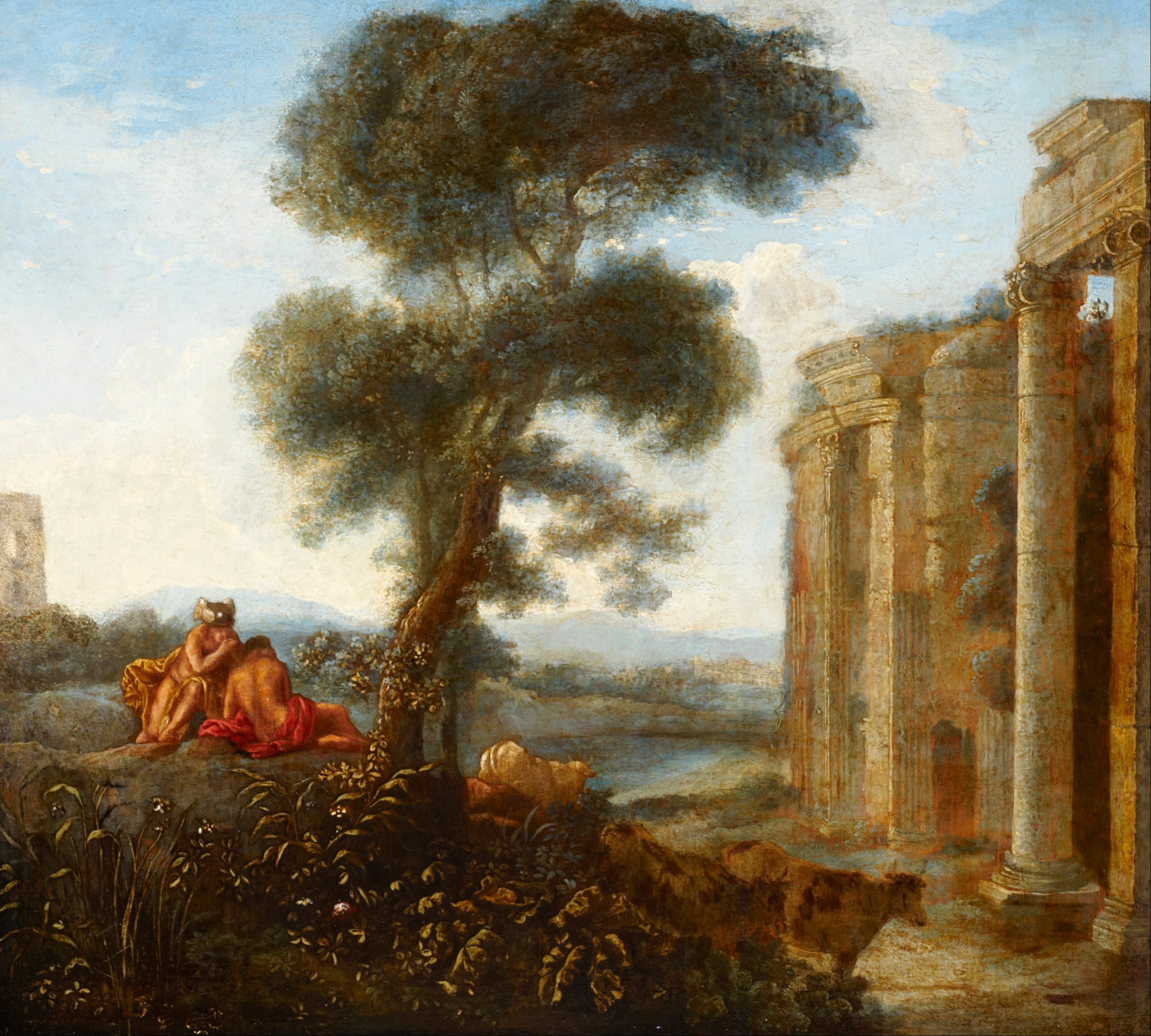
Mercury and Argus by Follower of Claude Lorrain (17th century)

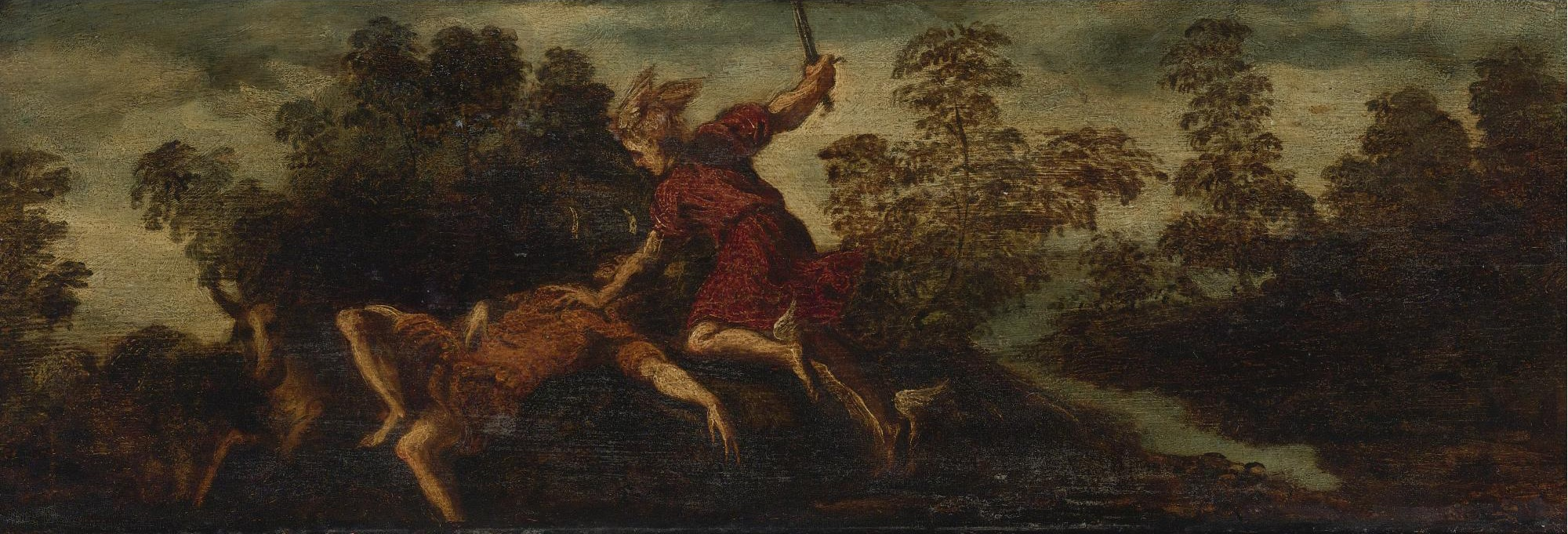
Mercury slaying Argus by Bonifazio Veronese

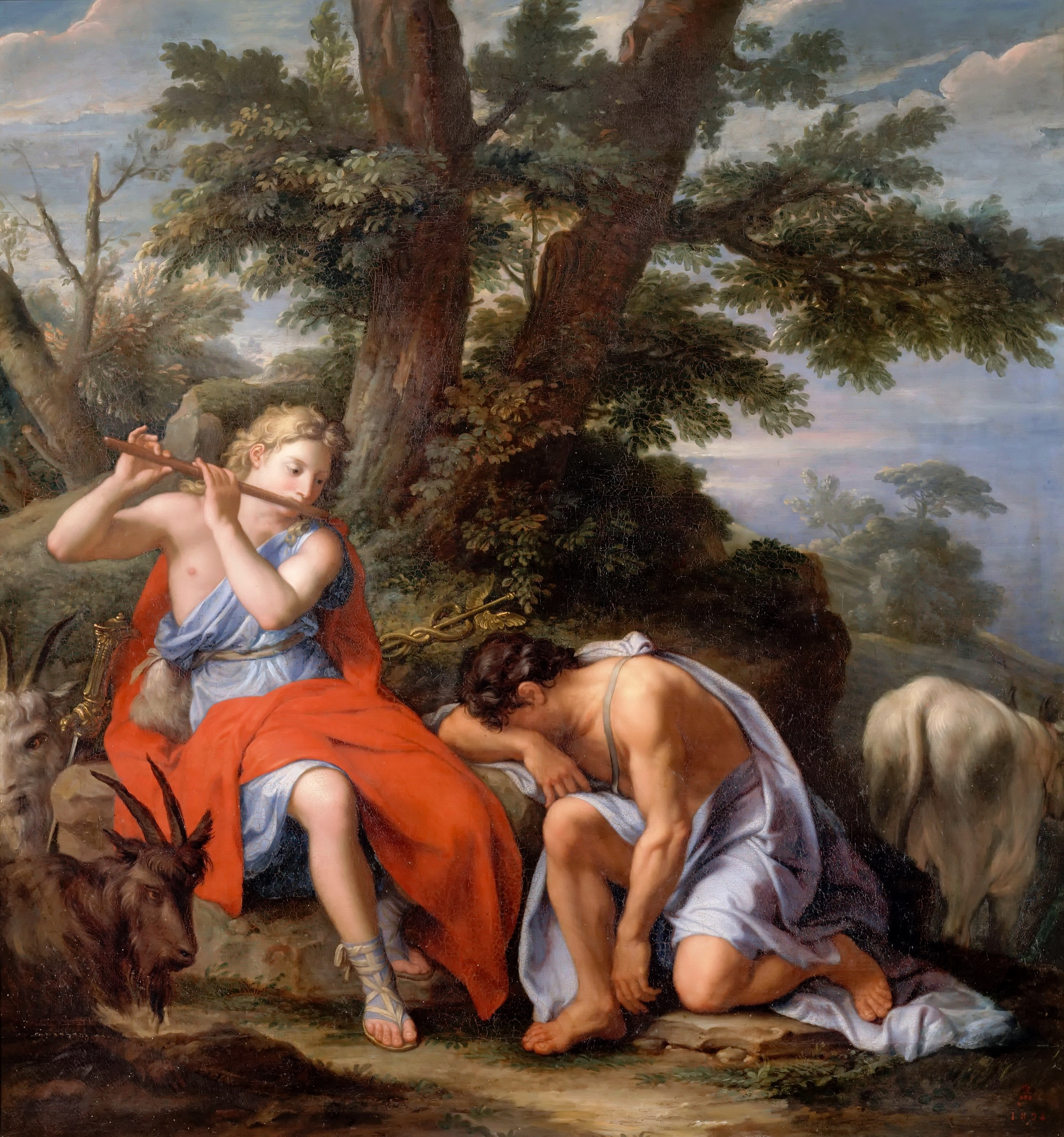
Mercury and Argus by René-Antoine Houasse (c. 1688)

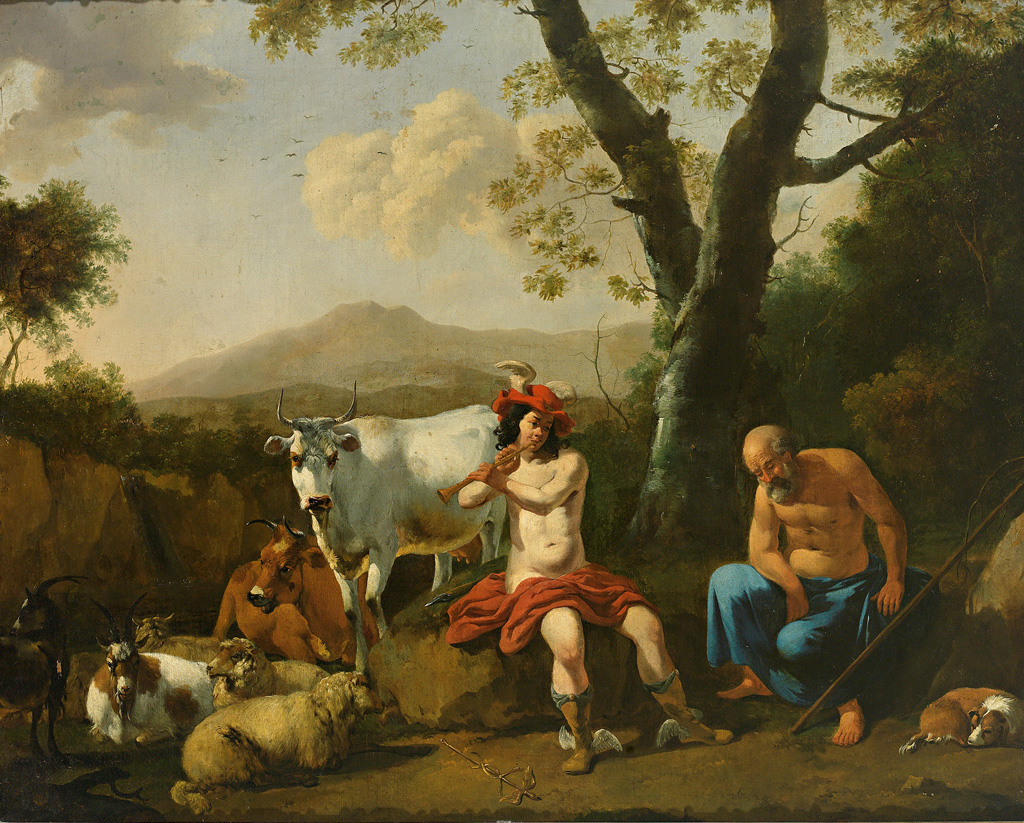
Mercury lulling Argus with his music by Circle of Cornelius van Poelenburgh (c. 1650)

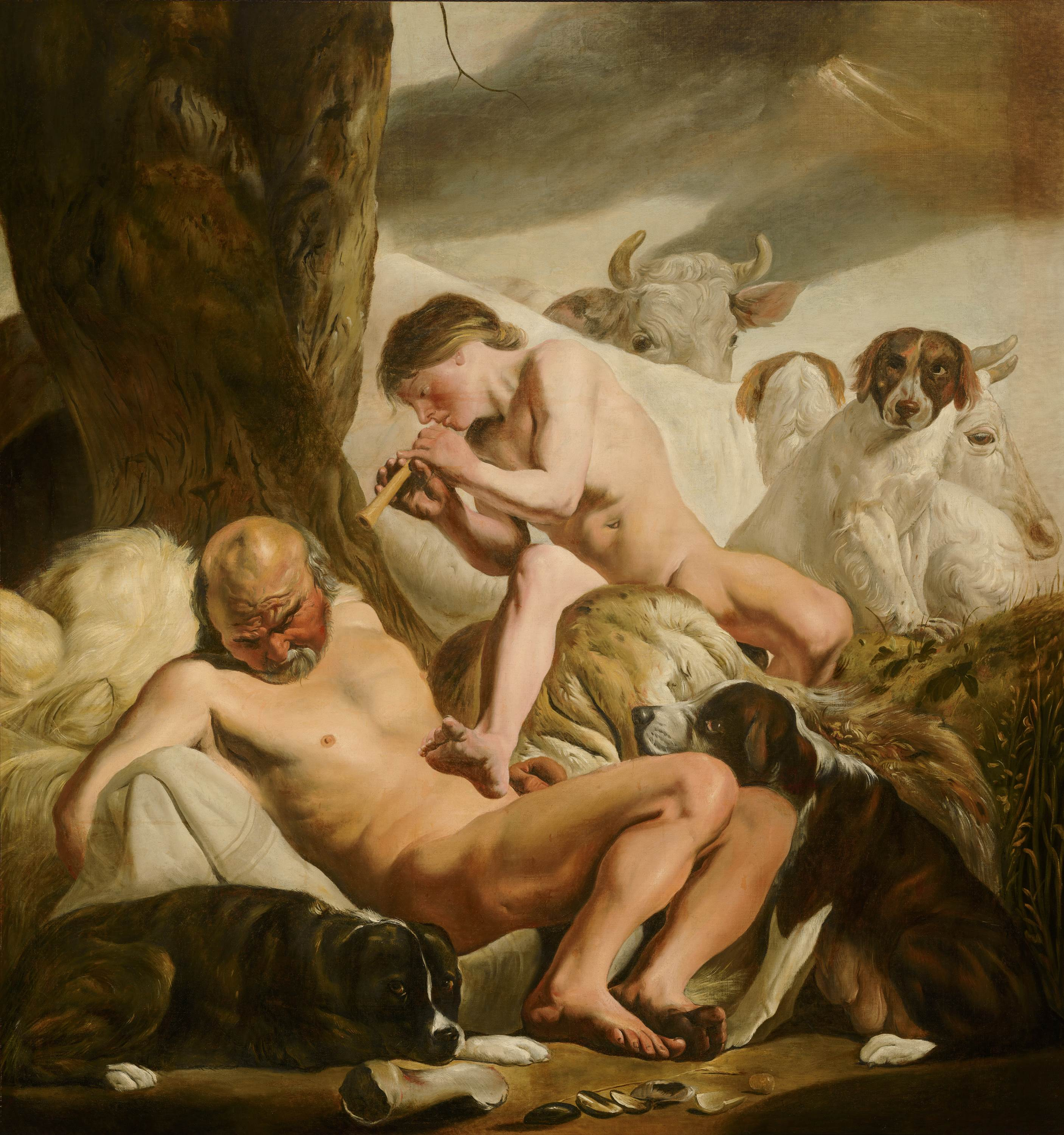
Argus, Mercury and Io by Jacob van Campen (c. 1630–1640)

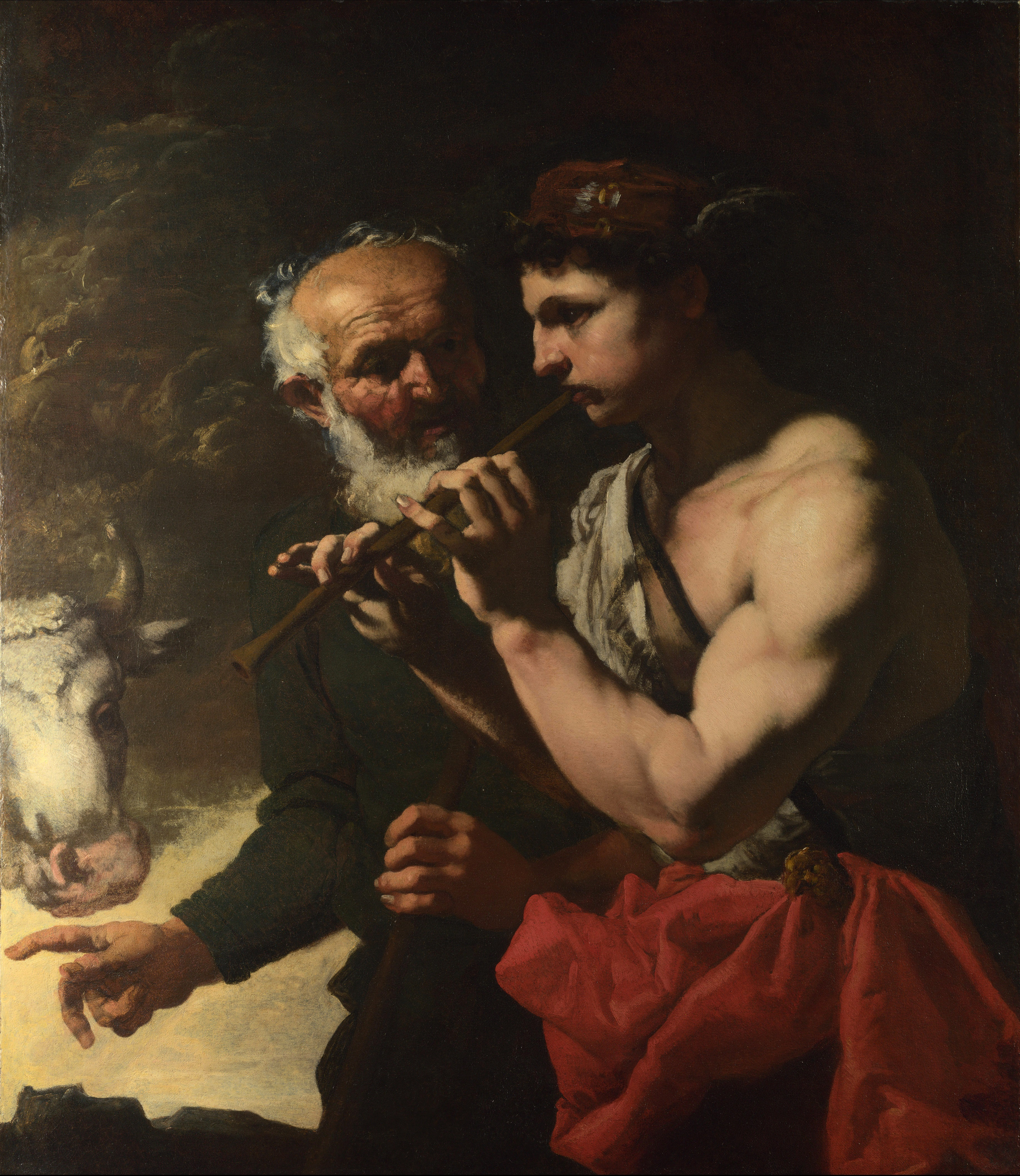
Mercury Piping to Argus by Johann Carl Loth (c. 1655–60)

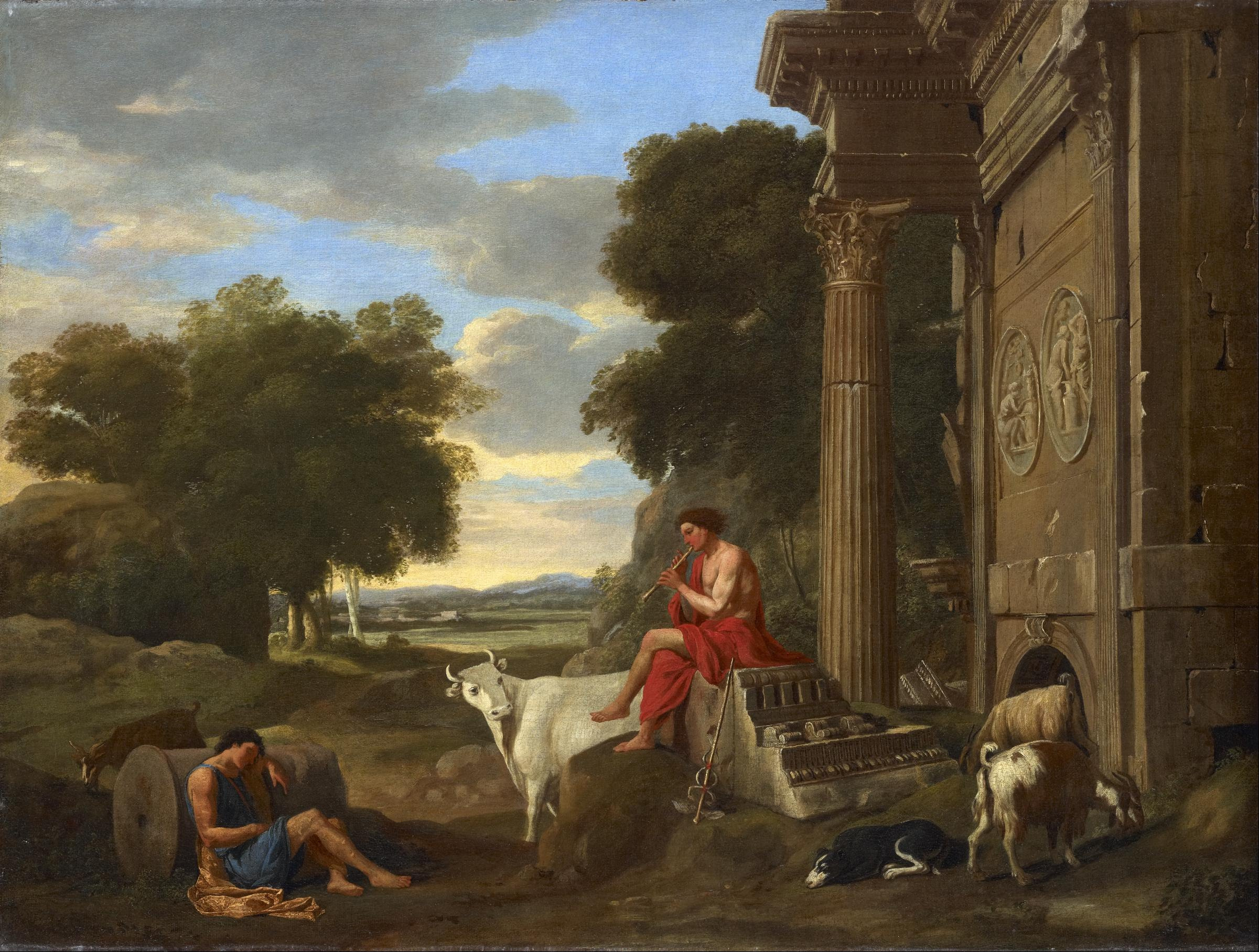
Mercury and Argus by Jean Lemaire (1625–1640)

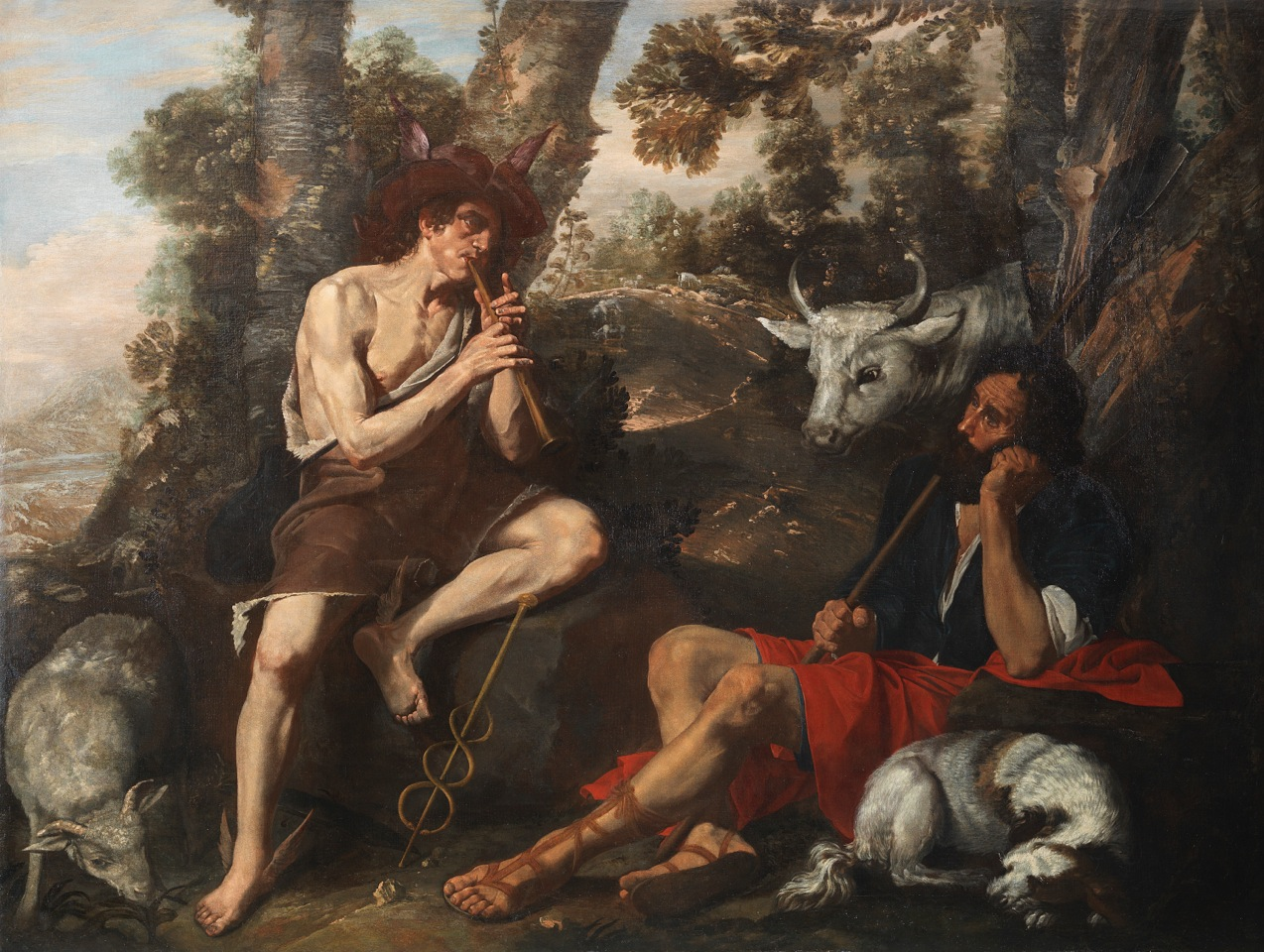
Mercurio addormenta Argo suonando il flauto by Hendrick de Somer

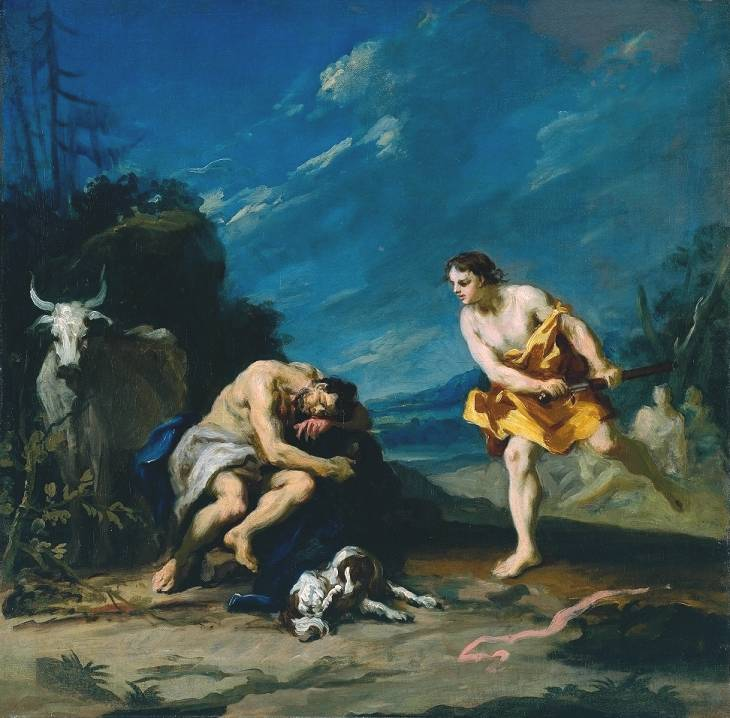
Mercury about to Kill Argus Having Lulled Him to Sleep by Jacopo Amigoni (1730–1732)

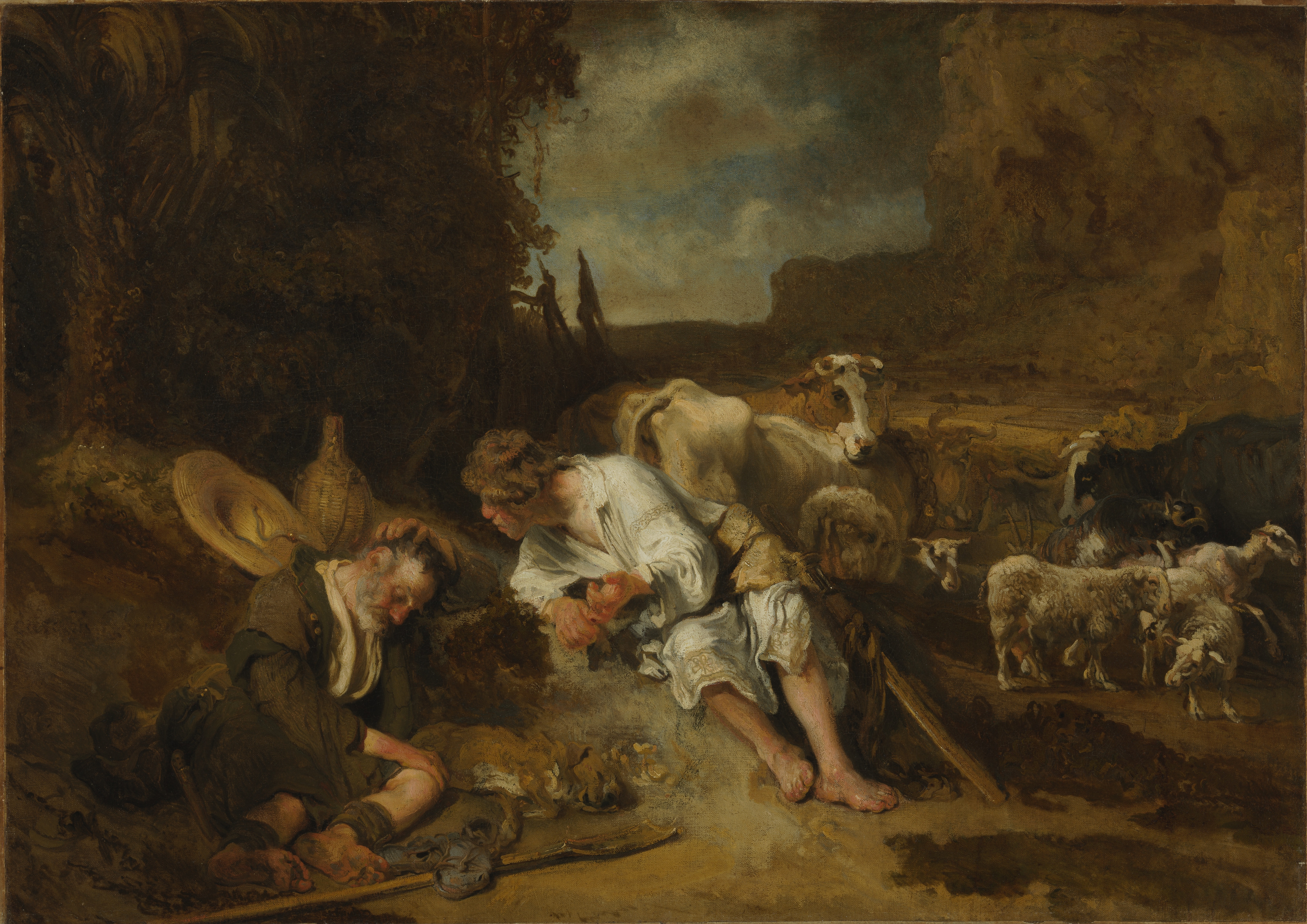
Mercury and Argus by Carel Fabritius (between c. 1645 and c. 1647)

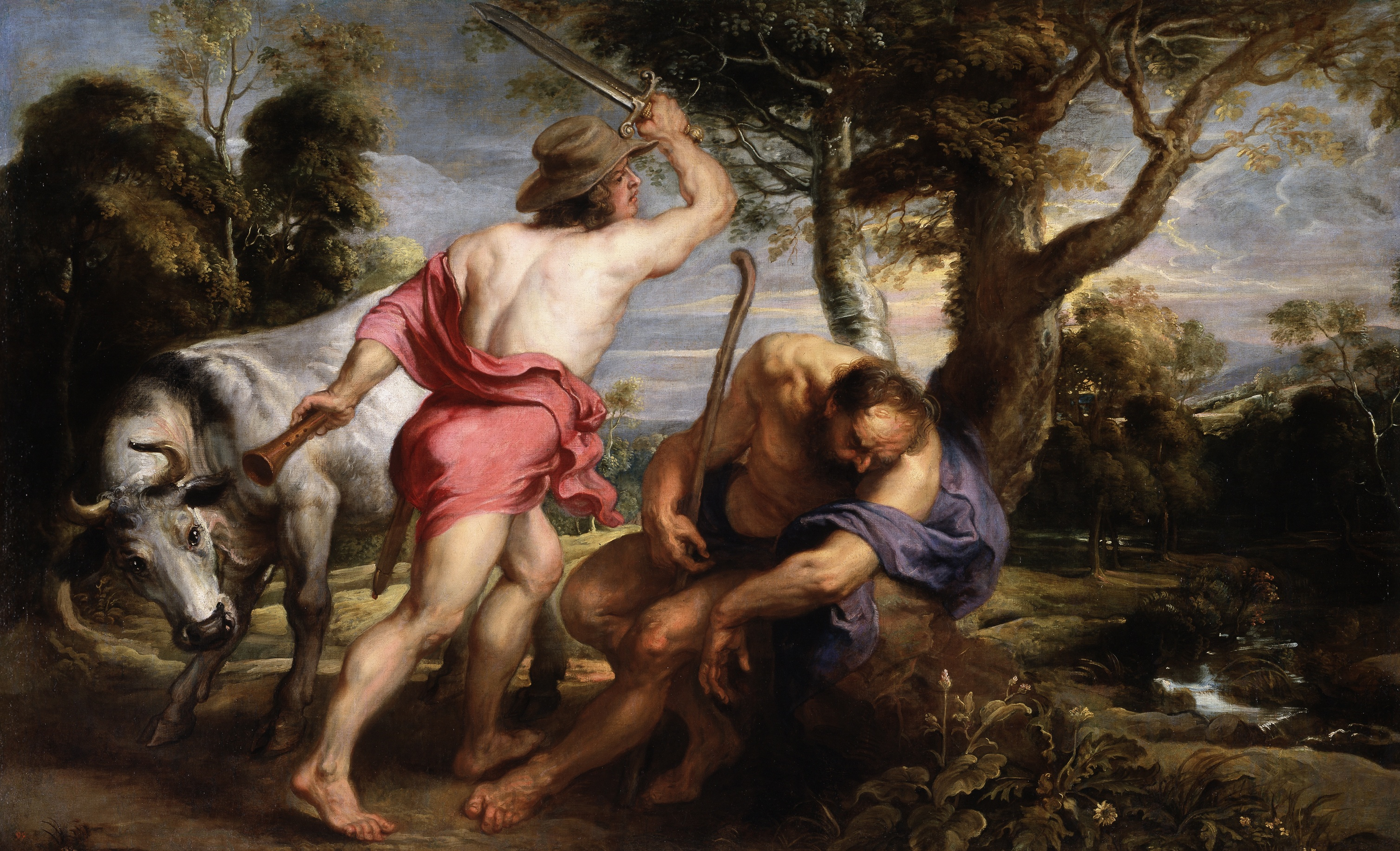
Mercury and Argos by Peter Paul Rubens (1636–1638)

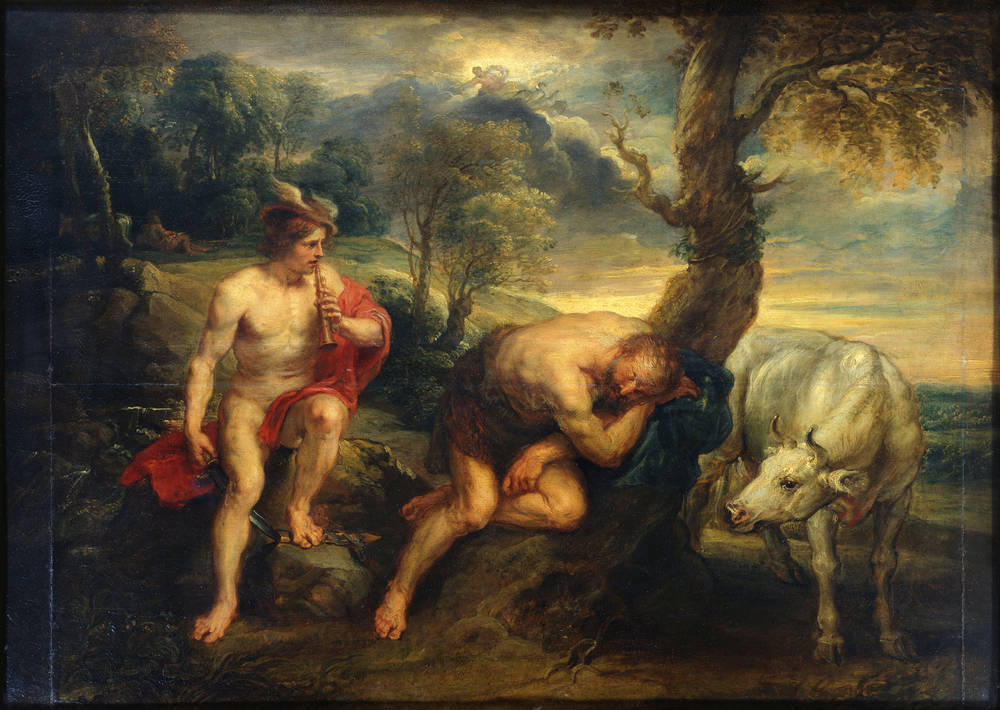
Mercury and Argus by Peter Paul Rubens (between 1635 and 1638)

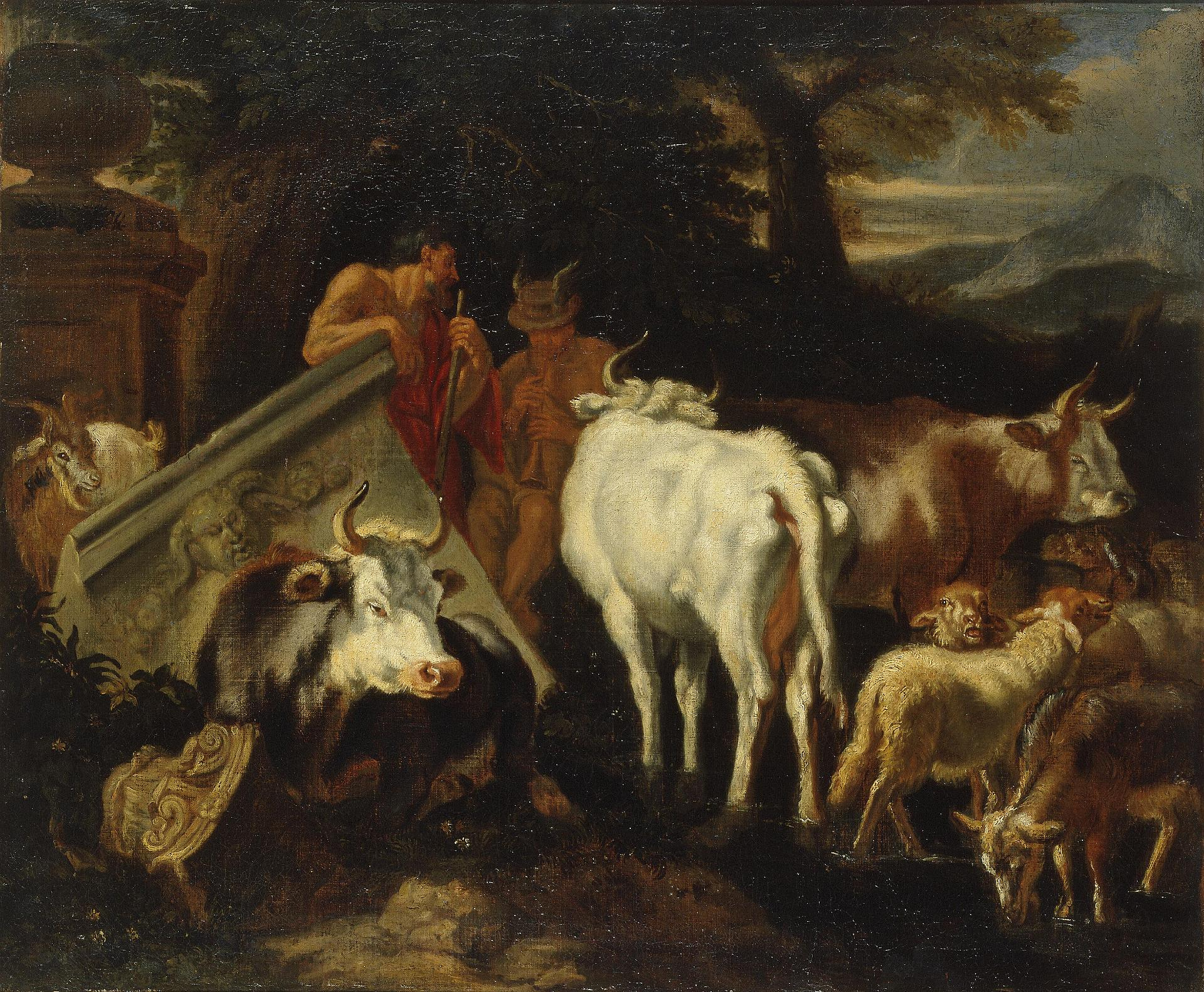
Mercury and Argus by Pieter van Bloemen (early 18th century)

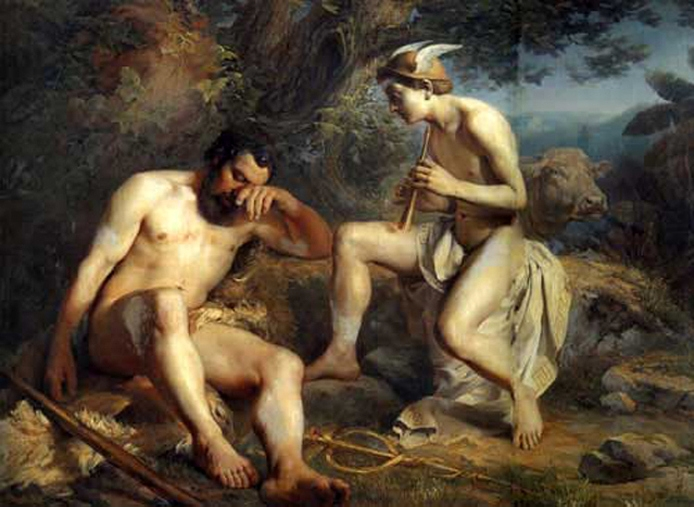
Hermes is putting Argus's eyes asleep to free Io by Nikolay Koshelev (1864)

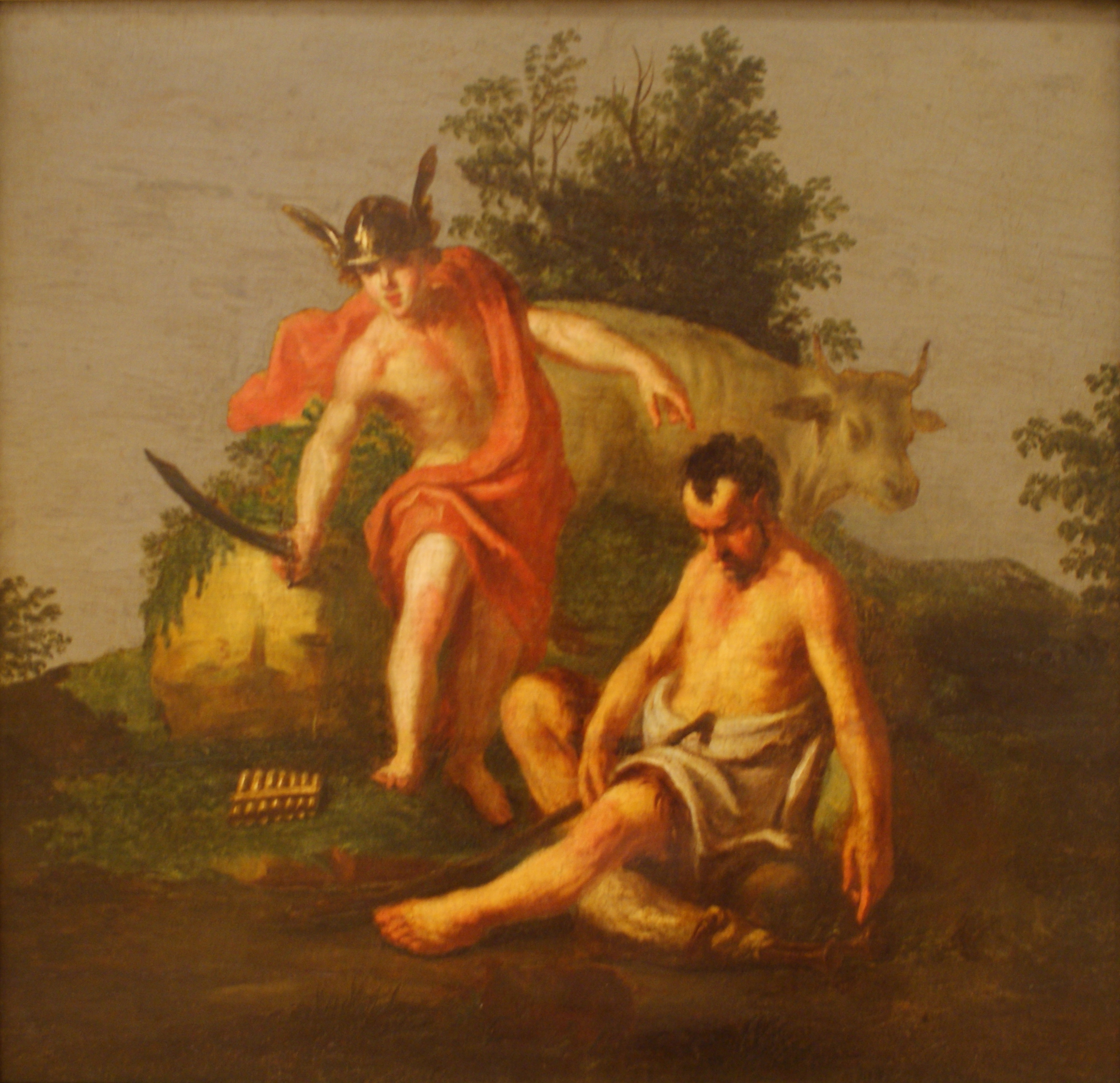
Mercury and Argus by Jan van Kessel the Elder (before 1679)

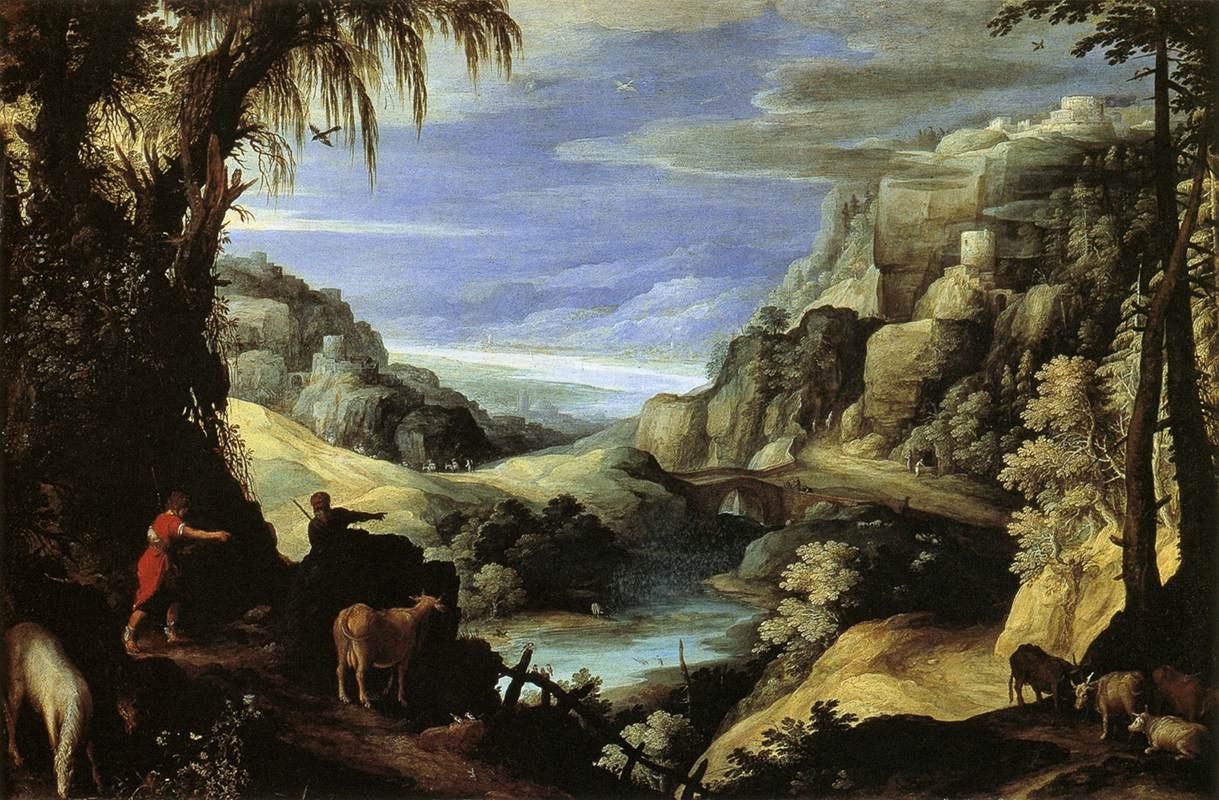
Landscape with Mercury and Argus by Paul Bril (1606)

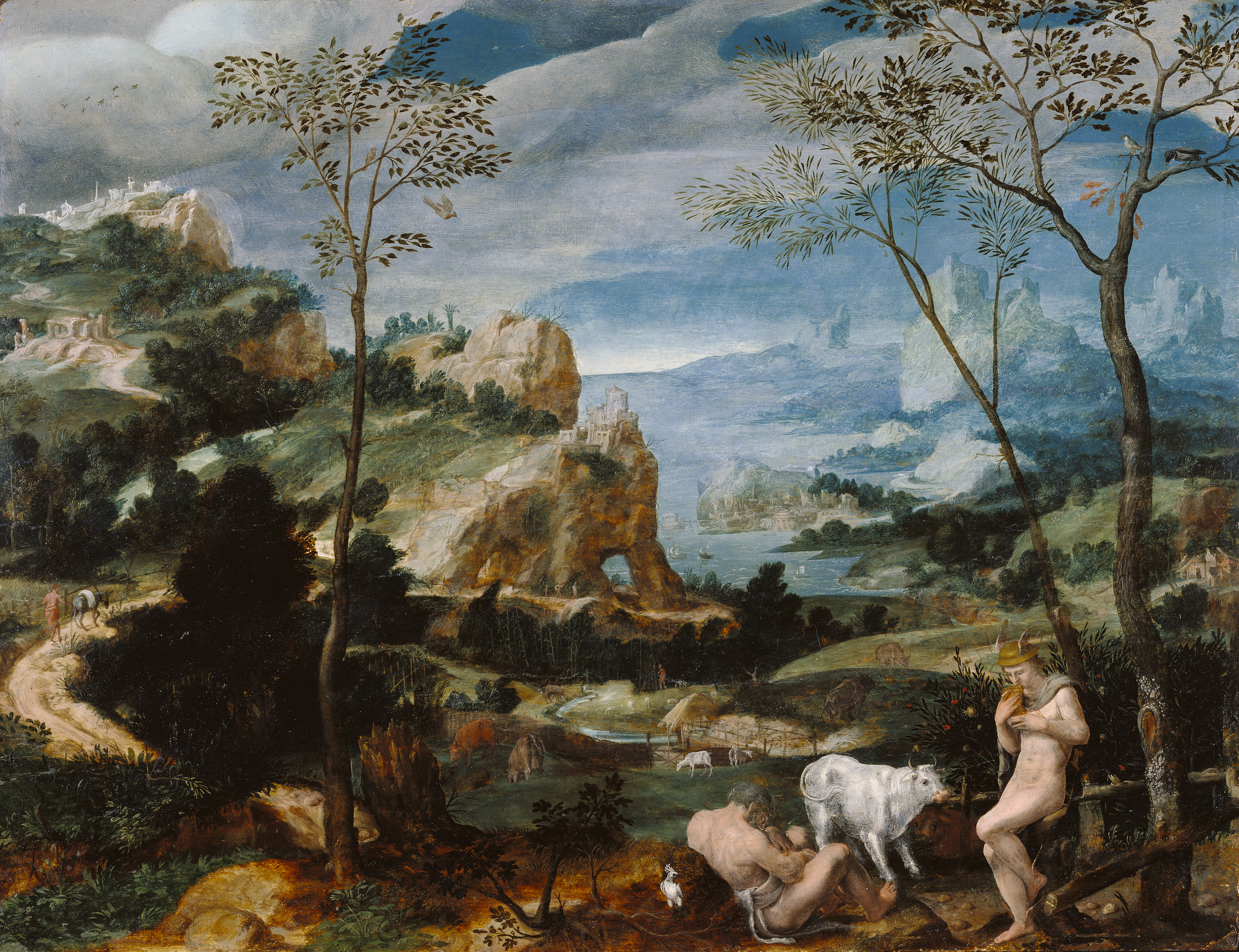
Landscape with Mercury and Argus (c. 1570)

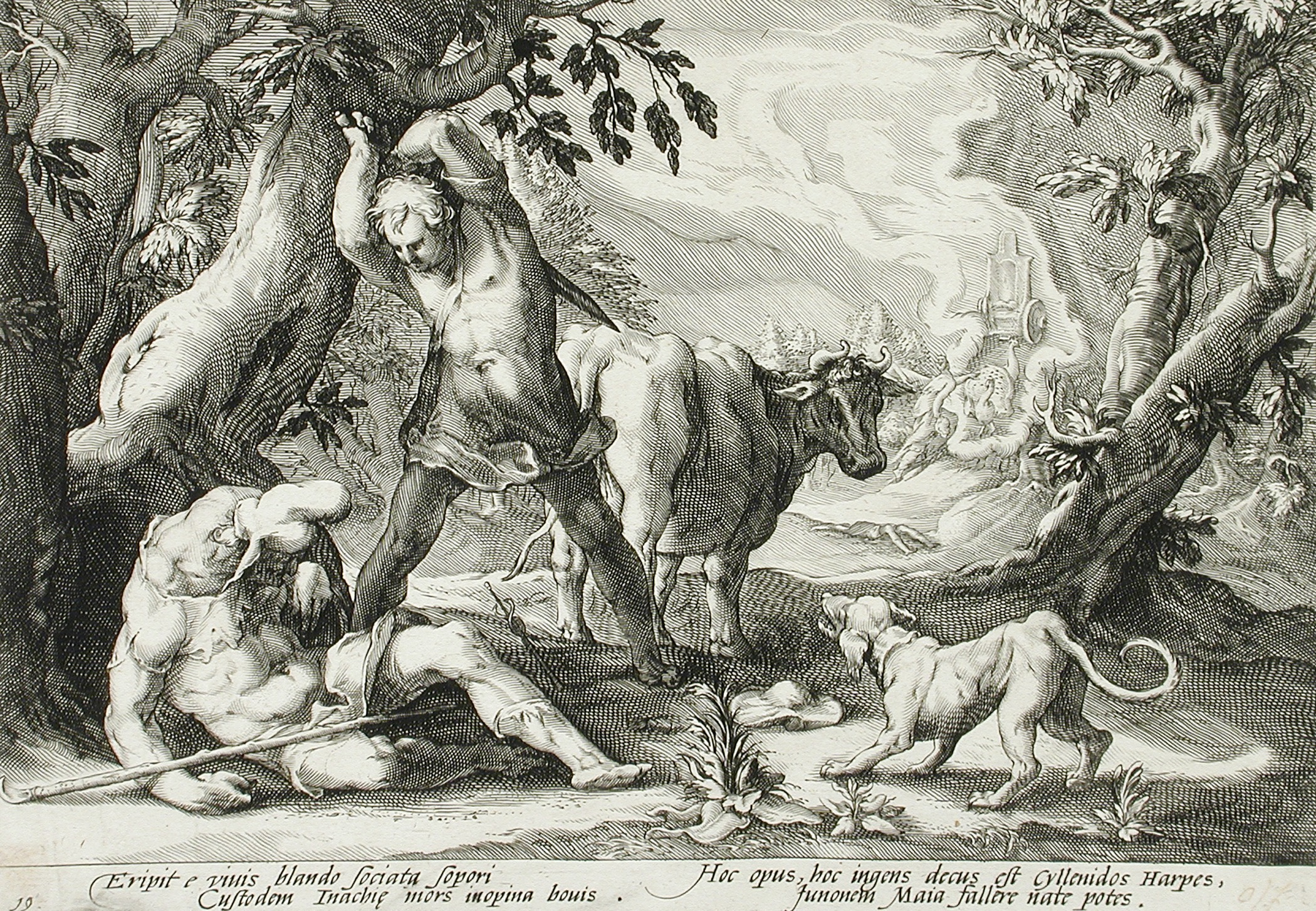
Mercury Killing Argus by Hendrik Goltzius (1589)

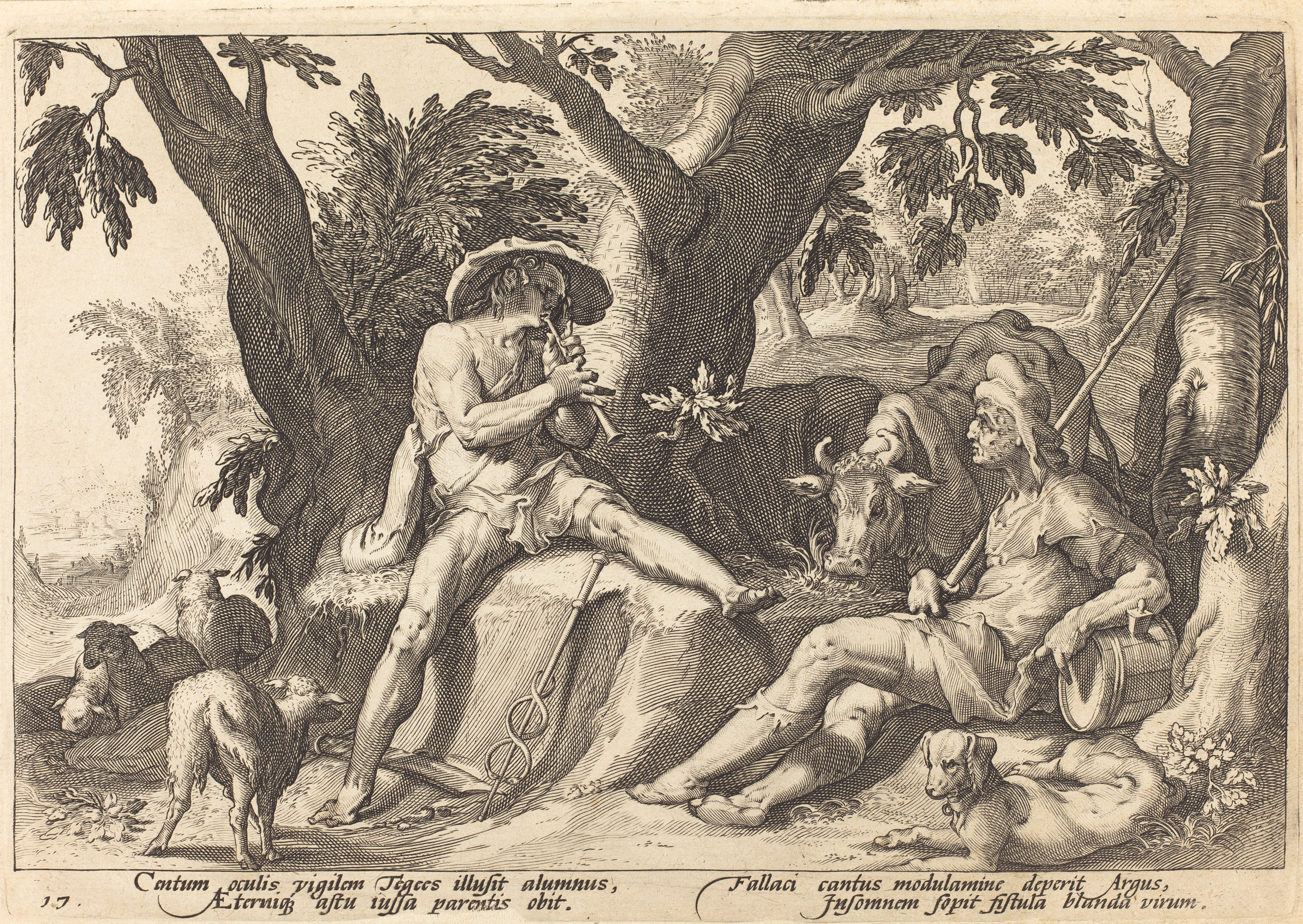
Mercury Putting Argus to Sleep by Hendrik Goltzius (16th or 17th century)

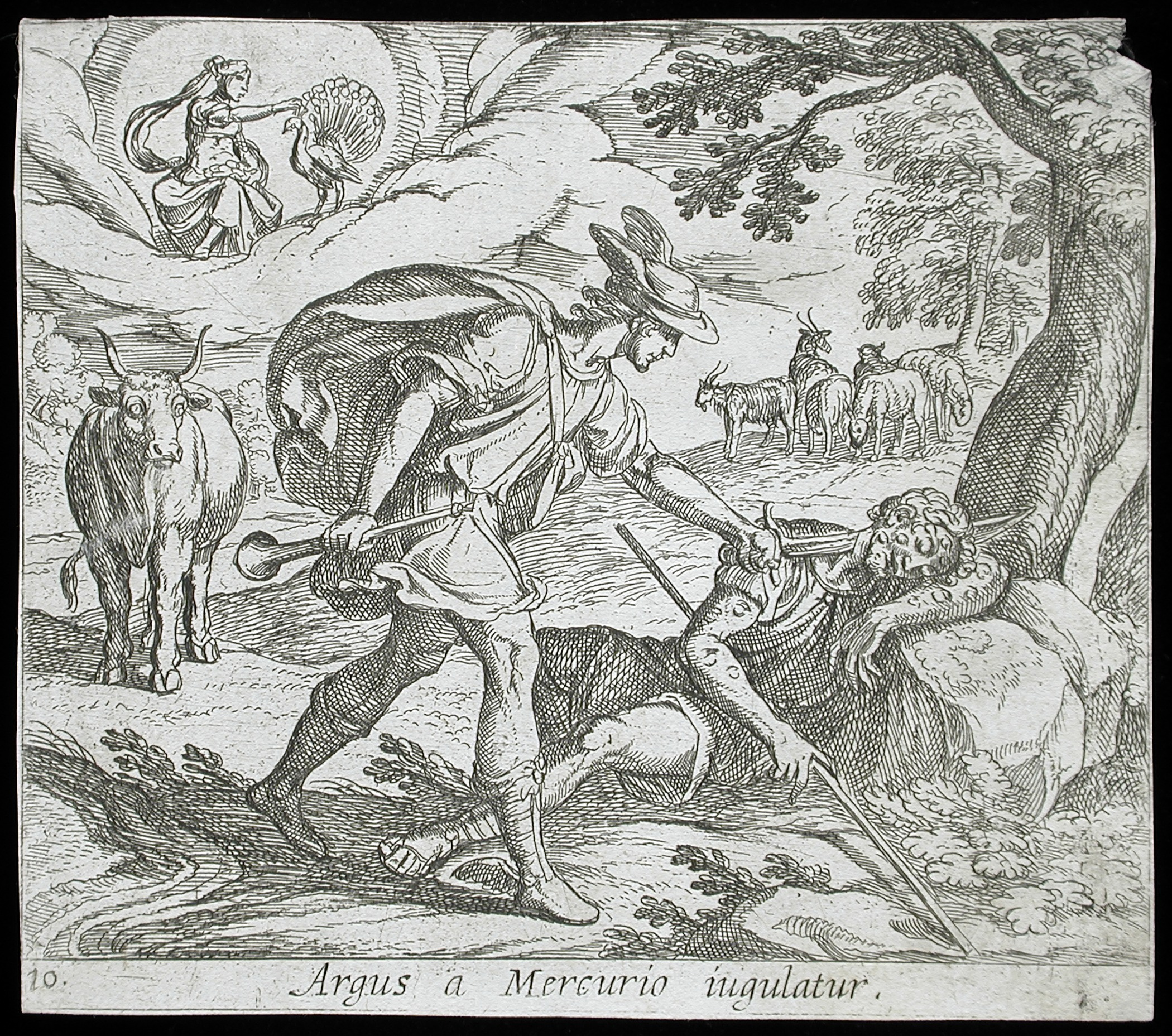
Mercury Killing Argus by Antonio Tempesta (1606)

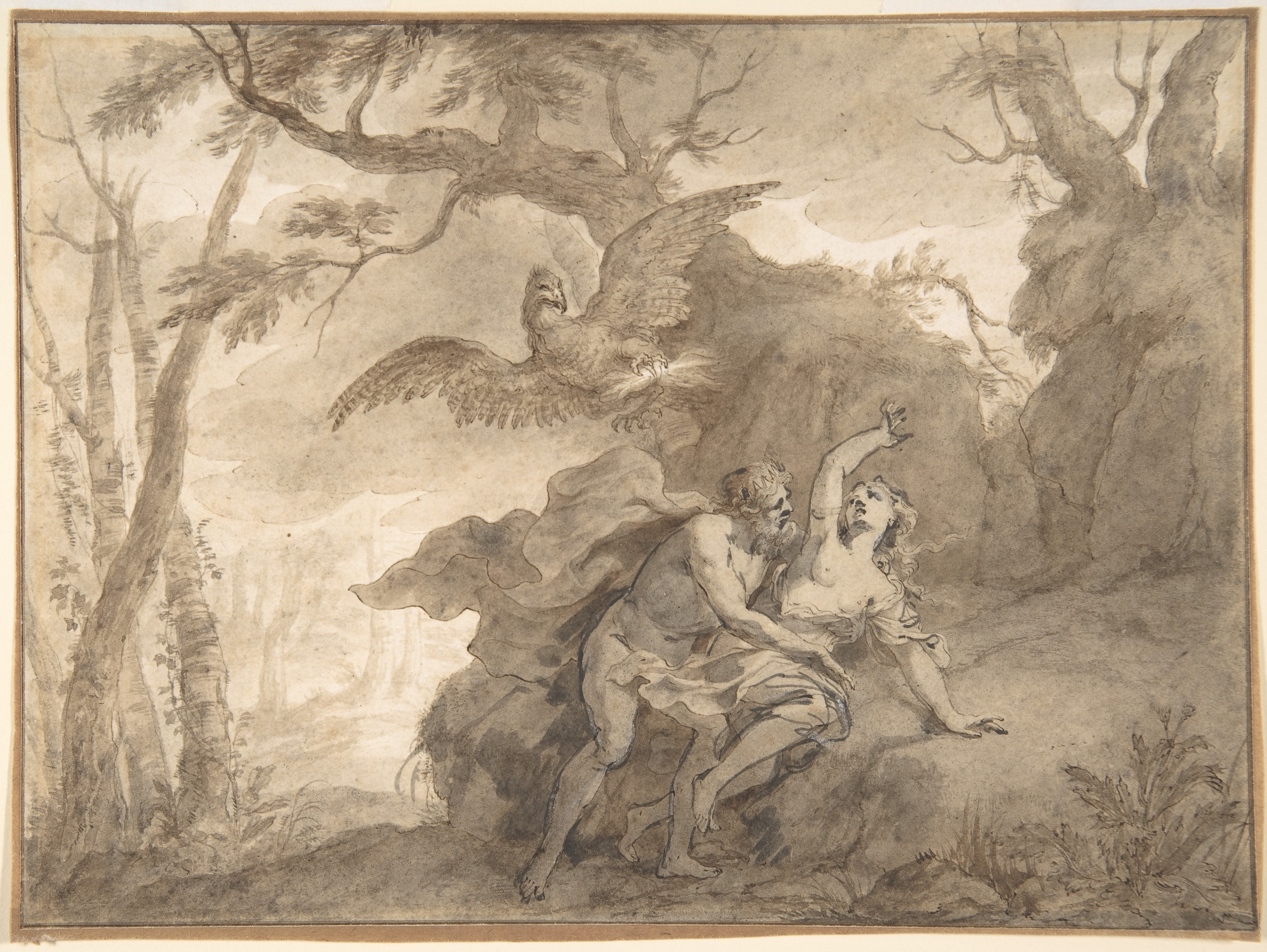
Illustrations to the Metamorphoses of Ovid, Mercury Rescuing Io from Argus by Godfried Maes (1664 - 1700)

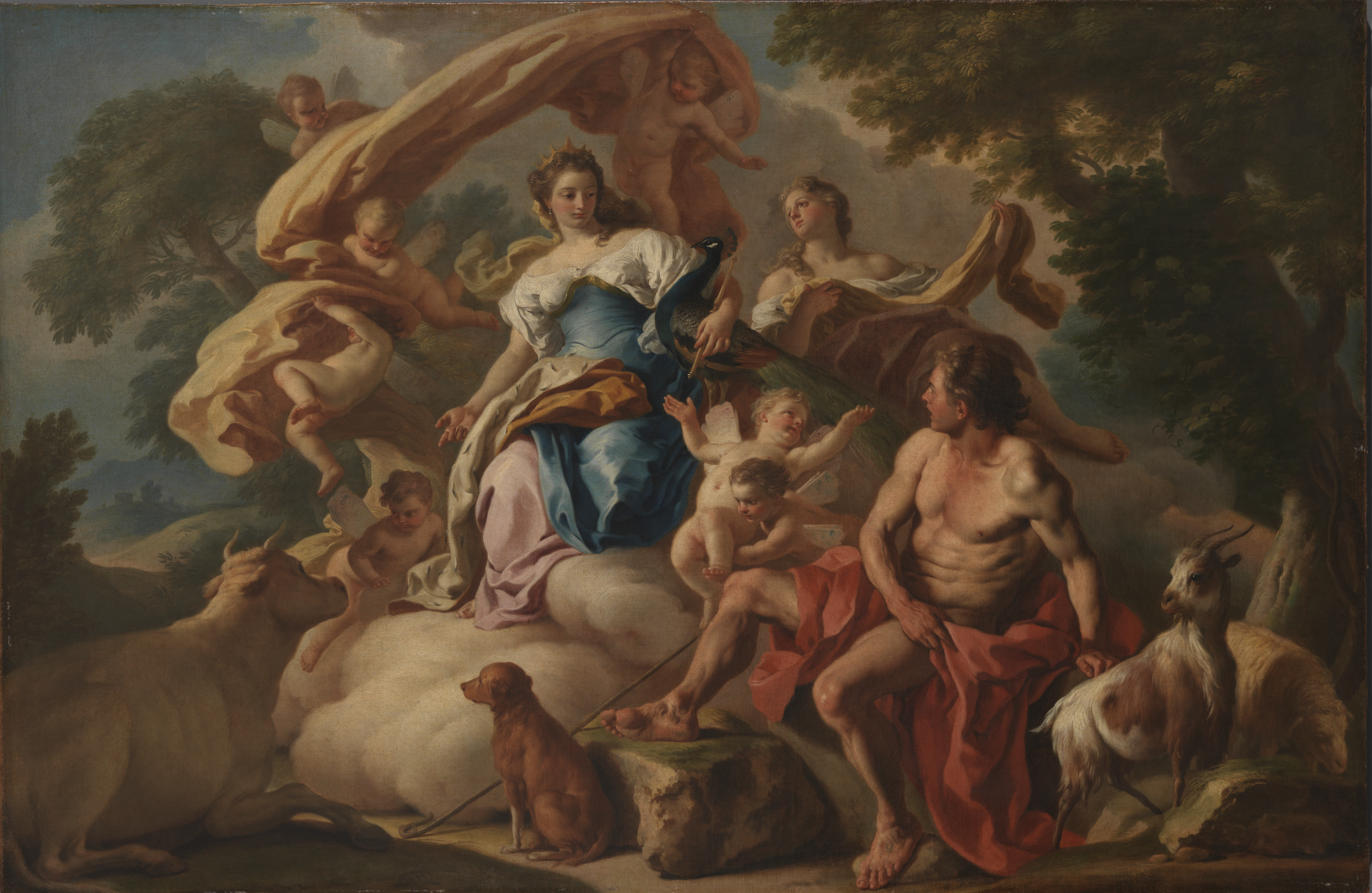
Juno (Hera) commits Io to Argus Panoptes by Francesco de Mura (1696–1784)
