= Balfron Tower =

Residential building in the London Borough of Tower Hamlets

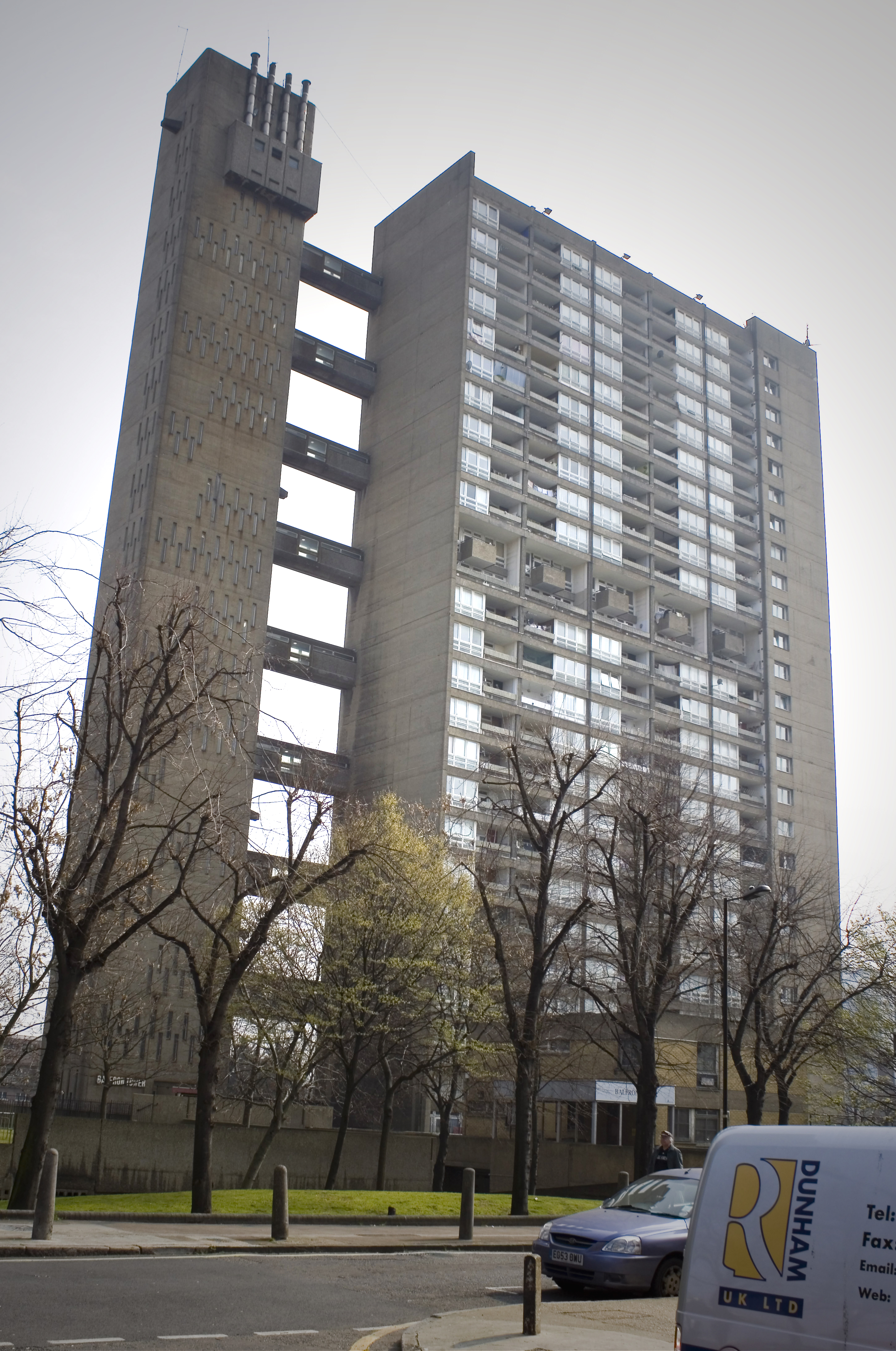
- Balfron Tower, a prominent example of Brutalist housing
- Interactive map of the Balfron Tower area

General information
- Type: Residential flats
- Location: London, E14; United Kingdom
- Coordinates: 51°30′49.1″N 00°00′31.7″W
- Construction started: 1965
- Completed: 1967

Height
- Roof: 84 metres (276 ft)

Technical details
- Floor count: 26

Design and construction
- Architect: Ernő Goldfinger
- Designations

Listed Building – Grade II*
- Official name: Balfron Tower
- Designated: 14 March 1996
- Reference no.: 1334931

Balfron Tower is a 27-storey residential building in Poplar, located in the London Borough of Tower Hamlets, London. Built in a Brutalist style, it forms part of the Brownfield Estate, an area of social housing between Chrisp Street Market and the A12 northern approach to the Blackwall Tunnel. It was designed by Ernő Goldfinger in 1963 for the London County Council, built 1965–67 by the GLC, and has been a listed building since 1996 (Grade II*, originally Grade II). Balfron Tower is stylistically similar to Goldfinger's later Trellick Tower in North Kensington, within West London.

== Design ==
Balfron Tower is 84 metres (276 ft) high and contains 146 homes (136 flats and 10 maisonettes). Lifts serve every third floor; thus, to reach a flat on the 11th, 12th, or 13th floors, residents or visitors would take a lift to the 12th. The lift shaft sits in a separate service tower, also containing laundry rooms and rubbish chutes, and joined to the residential tower by eight walkways.

The maisonettes are on floors 1 and 2, and 15 and 16, causing a break in the pattern of fenestration on the west side.

The service tower is topped by a boiler room. In 1985, the original concrete boiler flues were replaced with metal, due to concrete decay.

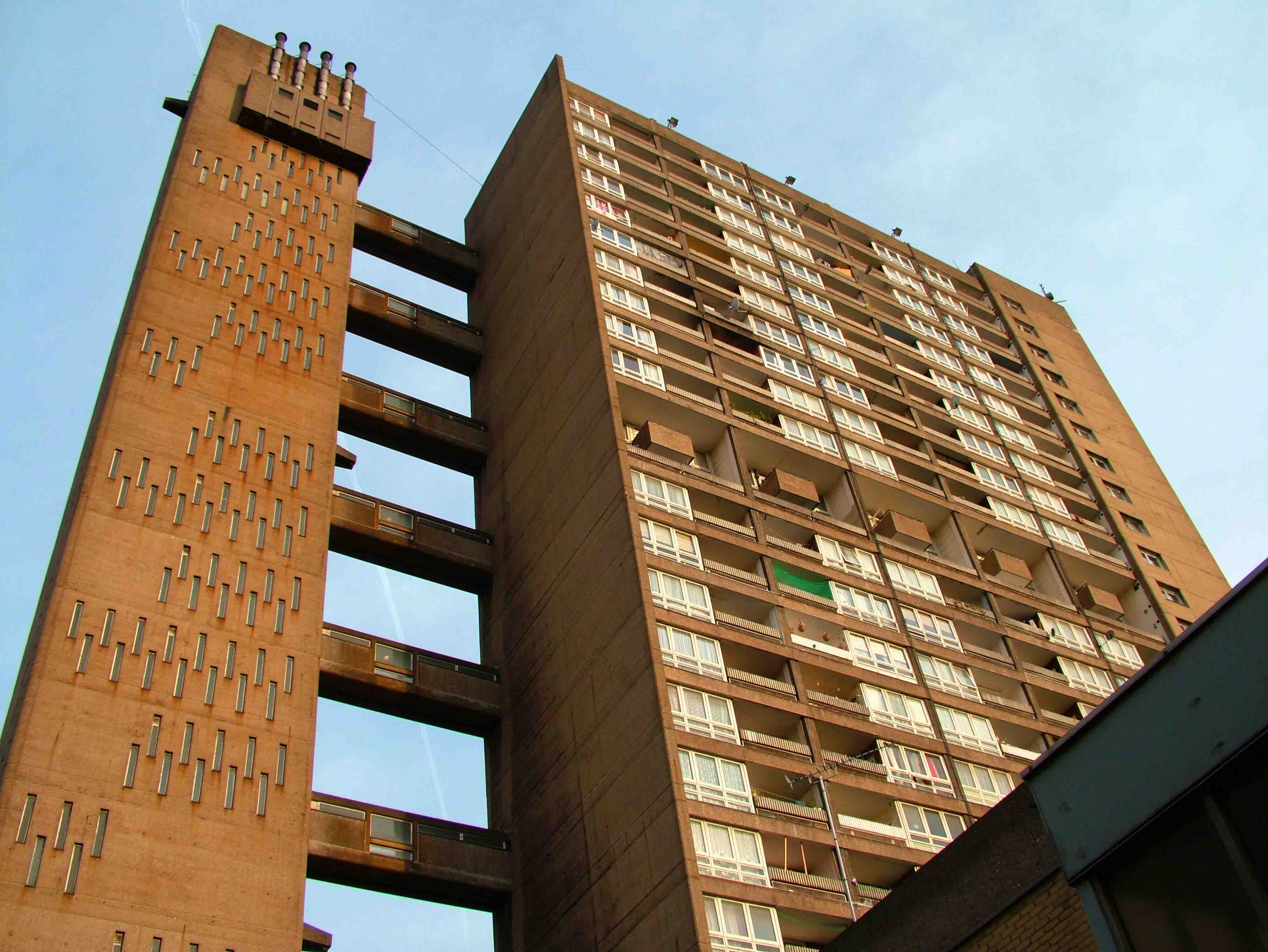
November 2005

== Carradale House ==
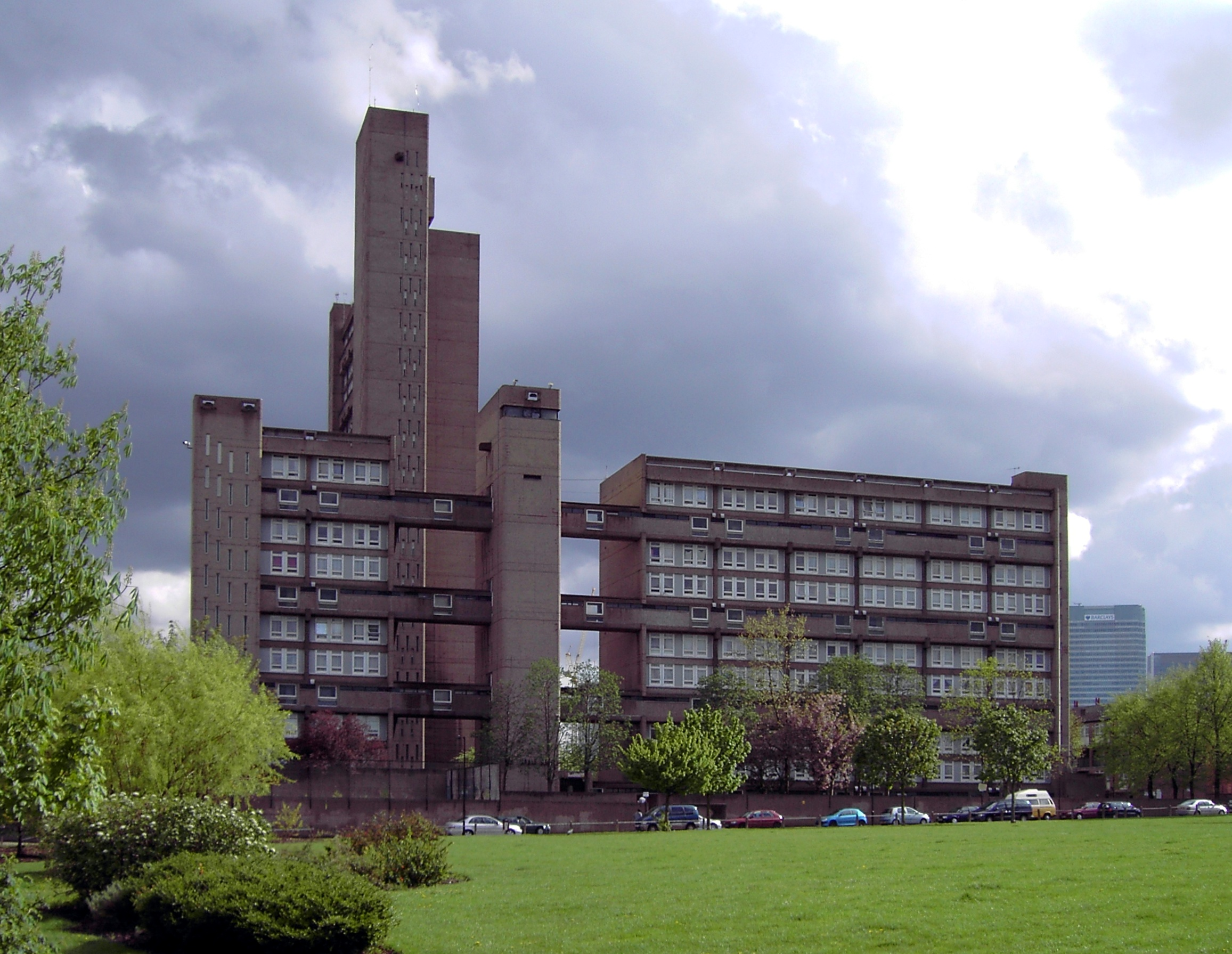
Carradale House, with Balfron Tower behind it

Carradale House (1967–70) is an adjacent, unique, modernist building, also designed by Ernő Goldfinger and Grade II listed. The two buildings appear to be natural extensions of each other, linked by style and design, with the long, low form of Carradale House complementing the height of Balfron Tower. All flats have dual window aspect and large south facing balconies, allowing plenty of natural light, and decorated with natural wood panels on the sides. The block is 37 metres (121 ft) tall with 11 floors, and contains 88 flats. The building has a similar podium to Balfron Tower, albeit more extensive with a large underground car park underneath. It too has sky bridges on the same principle of access at every third floor. After designing Balfron, Goldfinger identified all the possible improvements and incorporated them first in Carradale House and afterwards to Trellick Tower. Like Balfron Tower, the robust nature of the detailing to this building has helped it to weather the passage of time. Over the course of three years, Carradale underwent an extensive and careful renovation under the supervision of English Heritage and the direction of PRP Architects.

The two blocks were known as Rowlett Street Phases I and II during development before being named after the Scottish villages of Balfron and Carradale, a pattern followed in naming other locations on the nearby Aberfeldy and Teviot estates.

=== Brownfield Estate ===
Owen Hatherley describes the surrounding Brownfield Estate as "all designed with an attention to detail and quality of materials unusual for the 60s or any other decade".

== History ==
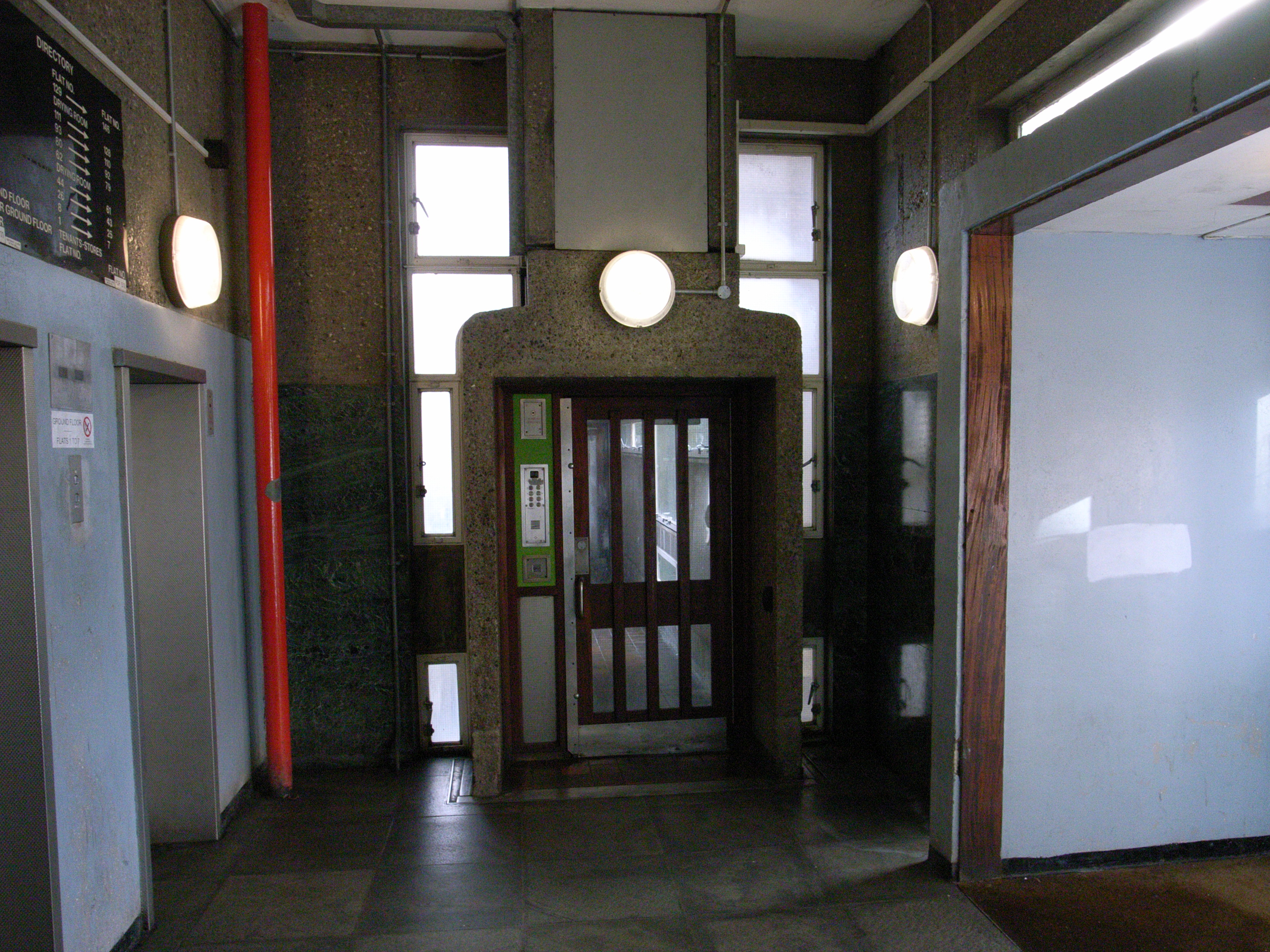
Balfron Tower lobby in 2008

Balfron Tower was designed by architect Ernő Goldfinger and is associated with the Brutalist style of 1960s architecture. Goldfinger himself was pleased with the design and moved into flat 130, on the 25th floor, for two months in 1968. He and his wife threw champagne parties to find out what the residents liked and disliked about his design. He applied what he learnt to his design for the similar and more famous Trellick Tower in West London. Goldfinger's studio later added Glenkerry House on the same estate, complementing Balfron Tower and Carradale in style.

The building was given Grade II listed status in March 1996, (later changed to Grade II*) followed by Carradale House in 2000. to spare them from demolition. Carradale and Glenkerry Houses were also included in the Balfron Tower Conservation Area, designated in 1998. The listing continues to attract comment, especially in view of the failure of another nearby Brutalist estate, Robin Hood Gardens, to obtain the same protection. In recent years Balfron Tower has been popular with visitors during the annual Open House Weekend.

In December 2007, following a ballot of residents in 2006, Tower Hamlets Council transferred its ownership of Balfron Tower, Carradale House and the surrounding Brownfield Estate to Poplar HARCA, a housing association.

== Refurbishment and sell-off ==
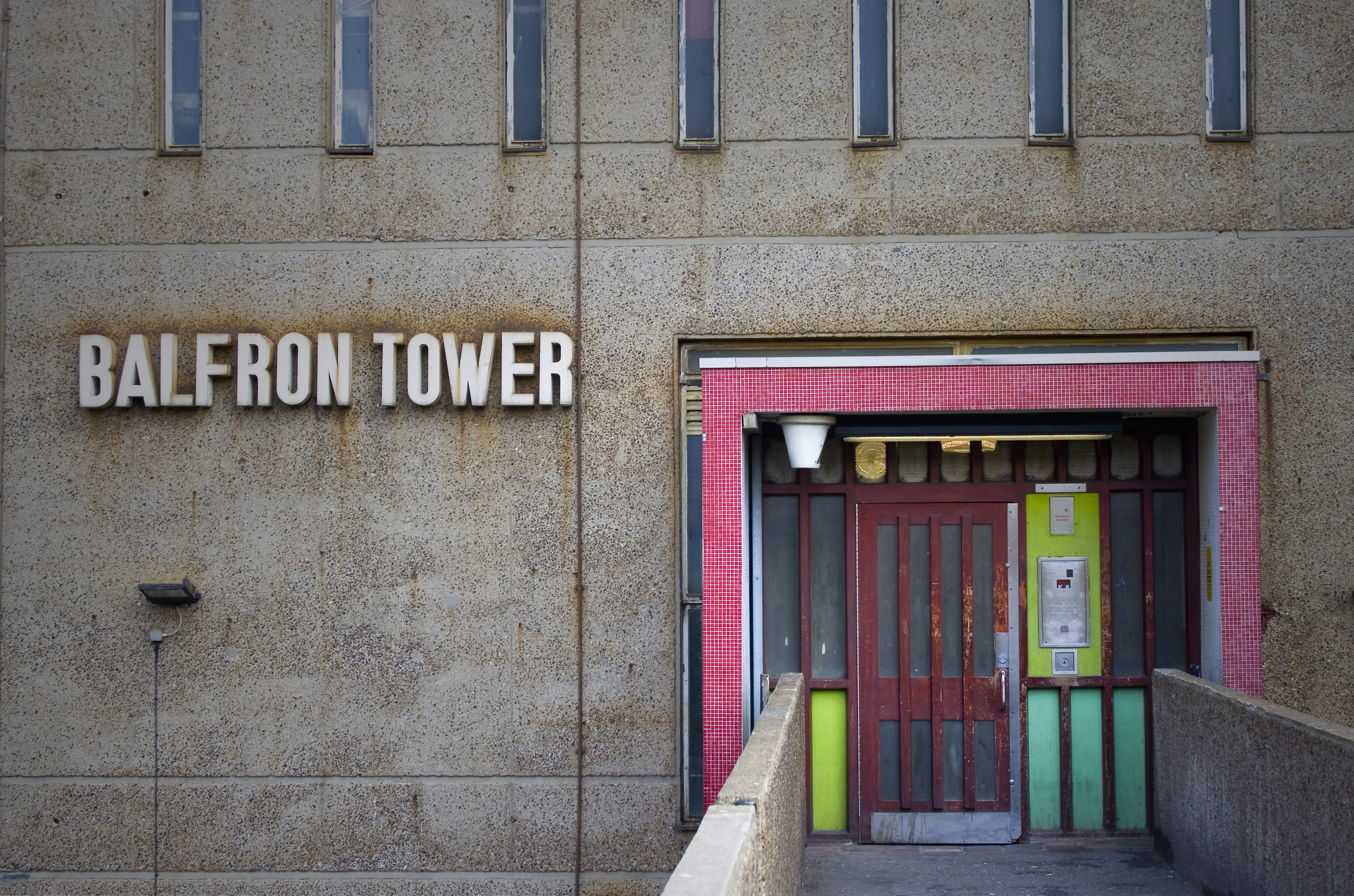
Entrance door to the tower

HARCA began a full refurbishment of the buildings in 2011. The architectural firm PRP which took up this project looked to restore these Brutalist structures to their original form as required by English Heritage, and also to bring the buildings up to modern specifications and 21st century living standards. The refurbishment was technically challenging, due to the need to install new services without disturbing the listed exterior. The solid concrete design also suffers inherently from cold bridging, which had to be remedied by internal wall insulation.

Residents were to have the option to keep their flats in the blocks, or to move into new low-rise homes nearby, in which case the vacated flats would be sold to finance the works. In October 2010, the residents of both blocks were sent notice that the refurbishment would require all residents to move out, due to fire safety and other risks, with no undertaking on whether they could return.

The first phase of the refurbishment took place from 2011 to 2014 with the lower block, Carradale House. Key features of the refurbishment include: replacement of existing windows with high-performance examples matching original pattern; upgrade of thermal performance using materials to provide insulation and vapour barriers; efficient gas-fired boilers for replacement communal heating system; and new wet services, incorporating water conservation measures. Internally, communal spaces and flats are sensitively refurbished in keeping and without altering Goldfinger's original layouts and heritage features. These embody key considerations related to restoring the key elements of the original scheme, undertaking repair and replacement on like-for-like basis, ensuring a lifespan of at least 30 years, taking advantage of a once in a lifetime opportunity to scaffold the entire building and upgrading as far as possible to accord with modern standards. This will ensure its future effectiveness and desirability as a place to live.

Work to refurbish Balfron Tower was undertaken through a joint partnership with Londonewcastle, a luxury residential developer. Pending the works to Balfron Tower, some flats were temporarily occupied by artists, who contributed to the community and put on displays in "heritage flat" number 123. A major photographic project was undertaken in November 2010.

In September 2014, Wayne Hemingway restored Goldfinger's former flat number 130 to 1960s style as part of a National Trust exhibition on brutalism.

As residents were decanted, a campaign formed in December 2014 in an attempt to save 50% of the Balfron as social housing. In February 2015, residents and campaigners protested HARCA in February 2015 over fears that social tenants would be evicted. Shortly afterwards, it was announced that no social housing would be retained, and that all of the flats would be sold. Six "heritage" apartments have been retained with original layout and colour scheme, with fixtures matching the originals.

The second phase refurbishment plans were strongly opposed by the Twentieth Century Society in 2015. In particular they claim that the 'unsympathetic' replacement of the tower's windows has compromised the distinction and importance of the tower, reducing it from a 'genuinely iconic brutalist masterpiece' to an 'ersatz hybrid'.

Rowland Atkinson from the University of Sheffield said: "The decision to convert two of the most symbolic tower blocks in London from local authority to private residences is a sign of how much the city has been set in service to the needs of capital and the rich."

== In popular culture ==
Shots of the building are featured in music videos for "This Is Music" by The Verve, "Morning Glory" by Oasis, "Mortalhas" by ProfJam, "Ready to Go" by Republica, and “Money Talks” by Rubella Ballet.

Balfron Tower has appeared as a location in many British television programmes, often when an impression of urban deprivation was required. Some that used it extensively are "Faking It", the second episode of the BBC series Hustle; the ITV series The Fixer; and Whitechapel, a three-part drama series produced by Carnival Films.

The tower is featured in the 1988 film For Queen and Country, starring Denzel Washington and was the filming location for Shopping, a 1994 film written and directed by Paul W. S. Anderson. It also features in Danny Boyle's post-apocalyptic horror film 28 Days Later and the 2011 film Blitz.

William Raban shot About Now MMX (2010) during his artist's residency in Balfron Tower. In July 2014 artist Catherine Yass was refused permission to drop a piano from the Tower as part of a "community workshop to explore how sound travels".

In 2014, the National Trust refurbished flat 130, where Goldfinger lived, to resemble its appearance in the 1960s. The work was designed by Tilly Hemmingway, with objects donated by the Land of Lost Content, a popular culture museum in Shropshire.

UK grime artist Wiley used Balfron Tower and the Brownfield Estate as the location for the music video of his track "P Money" in 2015, which was then later featured in his 2017 album Godfather.

The tower is referenced in the song "Balfron" by the band John on their album God Speed in the National Limit.

== Transport ==
=== Buses ===
The estate is served by London Buses routes 108 and 309. London Buses routes 15, 115 and D8 run nearby.

=== Canals ===
The estate is adjacent to the junction of the Limehouse Cut canal and the River Lea Navigation at Bow Locks.

=== Docklands Light Railway ===
The nearest stations are Langdon Park and All Saints for Docklands Light Railway services towards Canary Wharf and Stratford.

=== London Underground Station ===
The nearest London Underground stations are Bromley-by-Bow tube station and Bow Road tube station on the District and Hammersmith & City lines in zone 2.

== See also ==
- Trellick Tower, similar tower in Kensal Town (west London)
- Glenkerry House, later block facing Balfron Tower, housing co-op
- List of Brutalist structures
