= Spangen =

Coordinates: 51°55′N 4°26′E

- Neighbourhood of Rotterdam
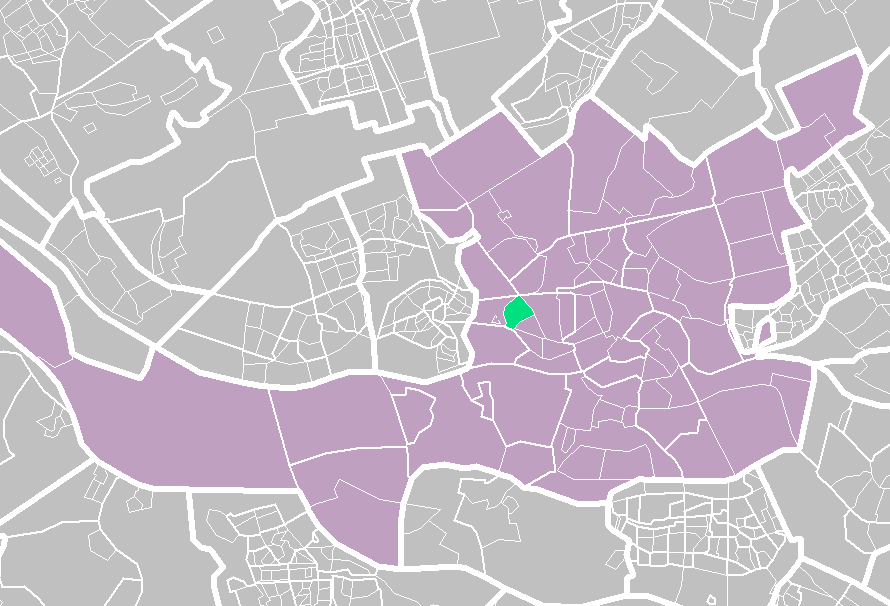
- Interactive map of Spangen
- Country: Netherlands
- Province: South Holland
- COROP: Rotterdam
- Borough: Delfshaven
- Time zone: UTC+1 (CET)

Spangen is a neighborhood of Rotterdam, Netherlands.

It is in the west of the city with about 10000 inhabitants. From the entrance of Spangen to the center is formed by the Mathenesserbrug across the Delfshavense Schie.

Socio-economically, Spangen is considered one of the poorest neighborhoods in the country. The population is over 85 percent of foreign origin. The design of the area is widely known among architects and urban planners,

== Town planning and architecture ==
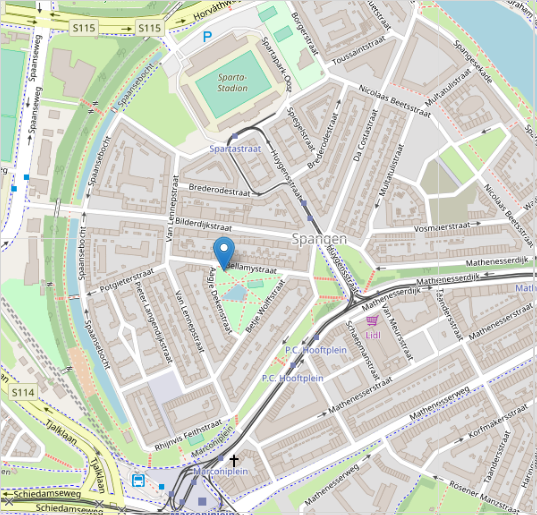
Spangen with the Justus van Effenkomplex to the SE, and the Sparta Stadion Het Kasteel to the north

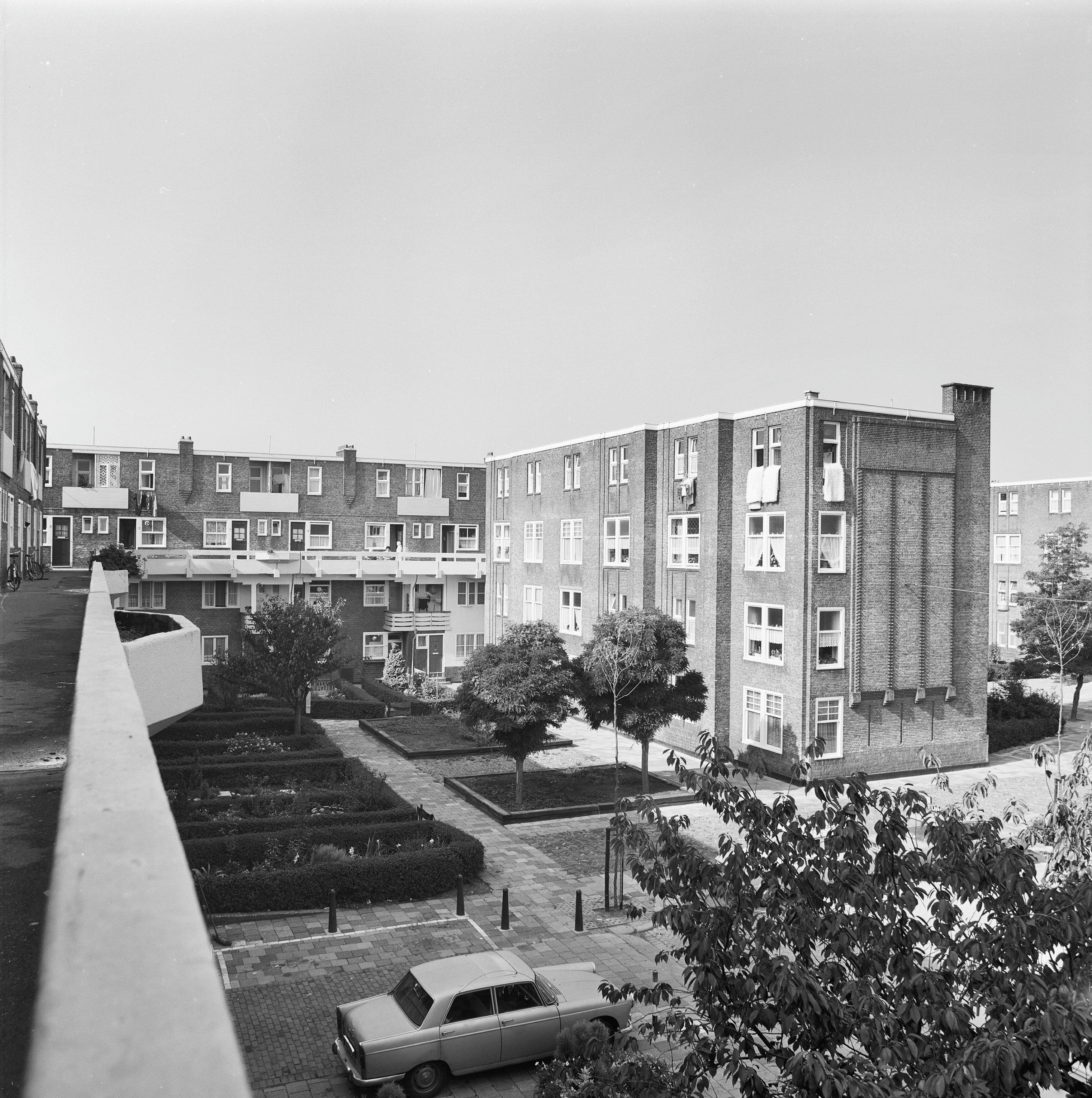
In 1976

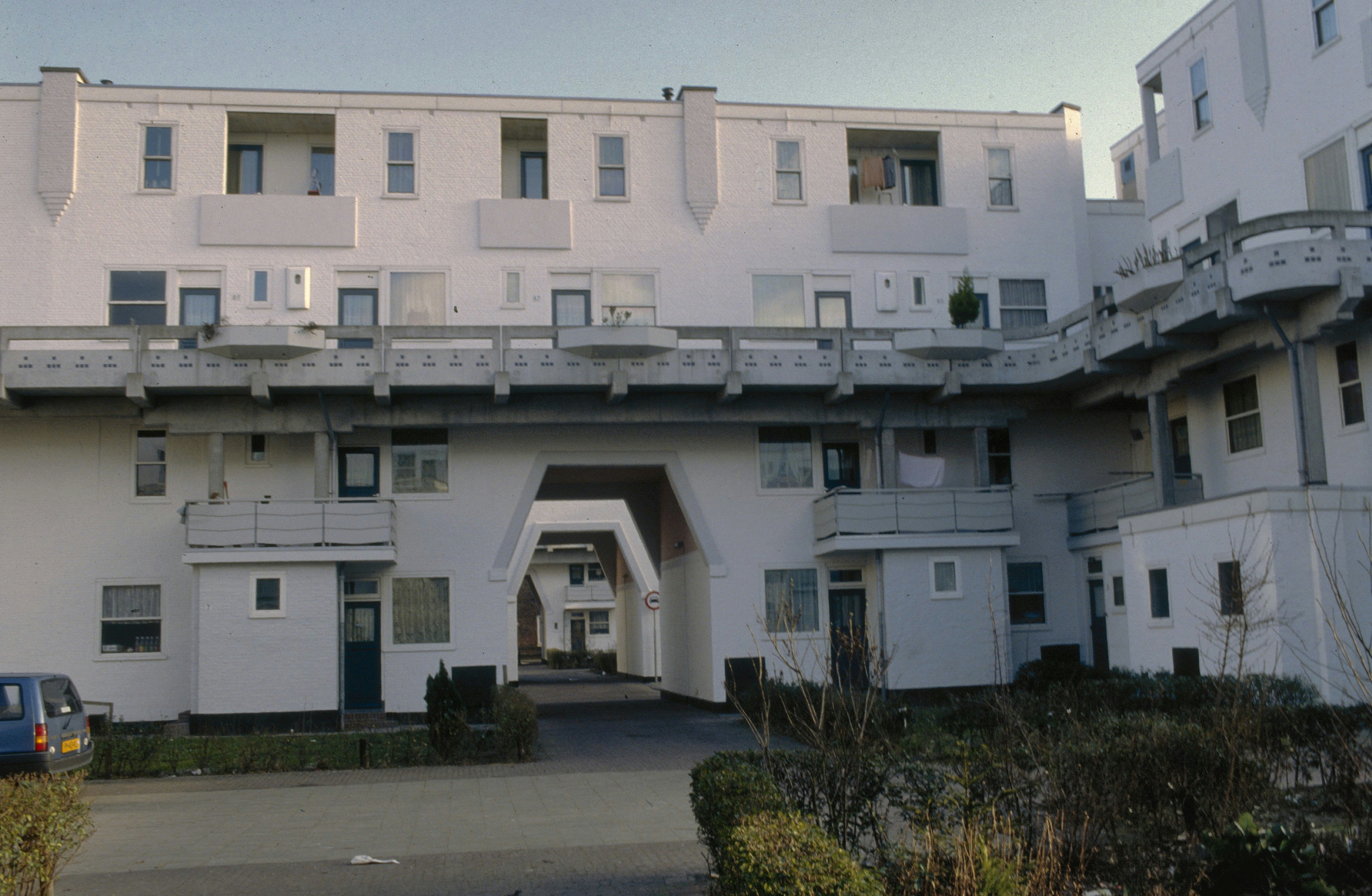
After the 1990s renovation

In 1909 the polder adjacent to the Kanal was drained and the city designated it land for housing the rapidly growing white collar population. Under a master plan drawn up the Gemeentelijke Woningdienst in 1917, all prominent architects designed housing blocks for the sector. There are blocks by Oud, Brinkman, Buskens, Kruithof en Meischke en Schmidt. The block on Justus van Effenstraat, the four storey Justus van Effencomplex by Michiel Brinkman introduced the concept of a shared private space, an inner courtyard over which the maisonettes focusses and on the third storey the maisonettes were accessed by a 3m wide continuous gallery. He called this a 'bovenstraat', which in English translates as a Street in the sky. This concept was developed by Le Corbusier for his Unite d'Habitation in Marseilles, and later by Peter and Alison Smithson for Golden Lane Estate and Robin Hood Gardens, in London.

The Justus van Effencomplex remained popular into the 1950s but then suffered demographic change, and lack of investment. In 1984, the De Jonge architectural practice began work on renovating this housing complex in close collaboration with the Netherlands Department for Conservation. Pairs of maisonette were combined into a single four- or five-room apartment suitable for families with children. The access gallery was carefully restored and partly replaced, the communal baths became a crèche and meeting room. However the courtyard walls were rendered in white and this rapidly deteriorated and the scheme was not judged a success.

In 2012 the complex was restored back to its original finishings.

=== Sparta Stadion ===
In the middle of Spangen is the oldest football stadium in the Netherlands, the Castle of Sparta from 1916. This stadium was completely renovated in 1999 and is now officially known as Sparta Stadion Het Kasteel.

== See also ==
- Michiel Brinkman
