= Coventry Cross (disambiguation) =

Coventry Cross may refer to:

- Coventry Cross (monument), a monument in Coventry, England
- The wooden cross or cross of nails at Coventry Cathedral, or one of many similar crosses given to various cathedrals around the world
- Coventry Cross Estate, a housing estate built by London County Council in Bromley-by-Bow, London, England, now owned by the housing association Poplar HARCA
