= Robin Hood Gardens =

Residential estate in Poplar, London

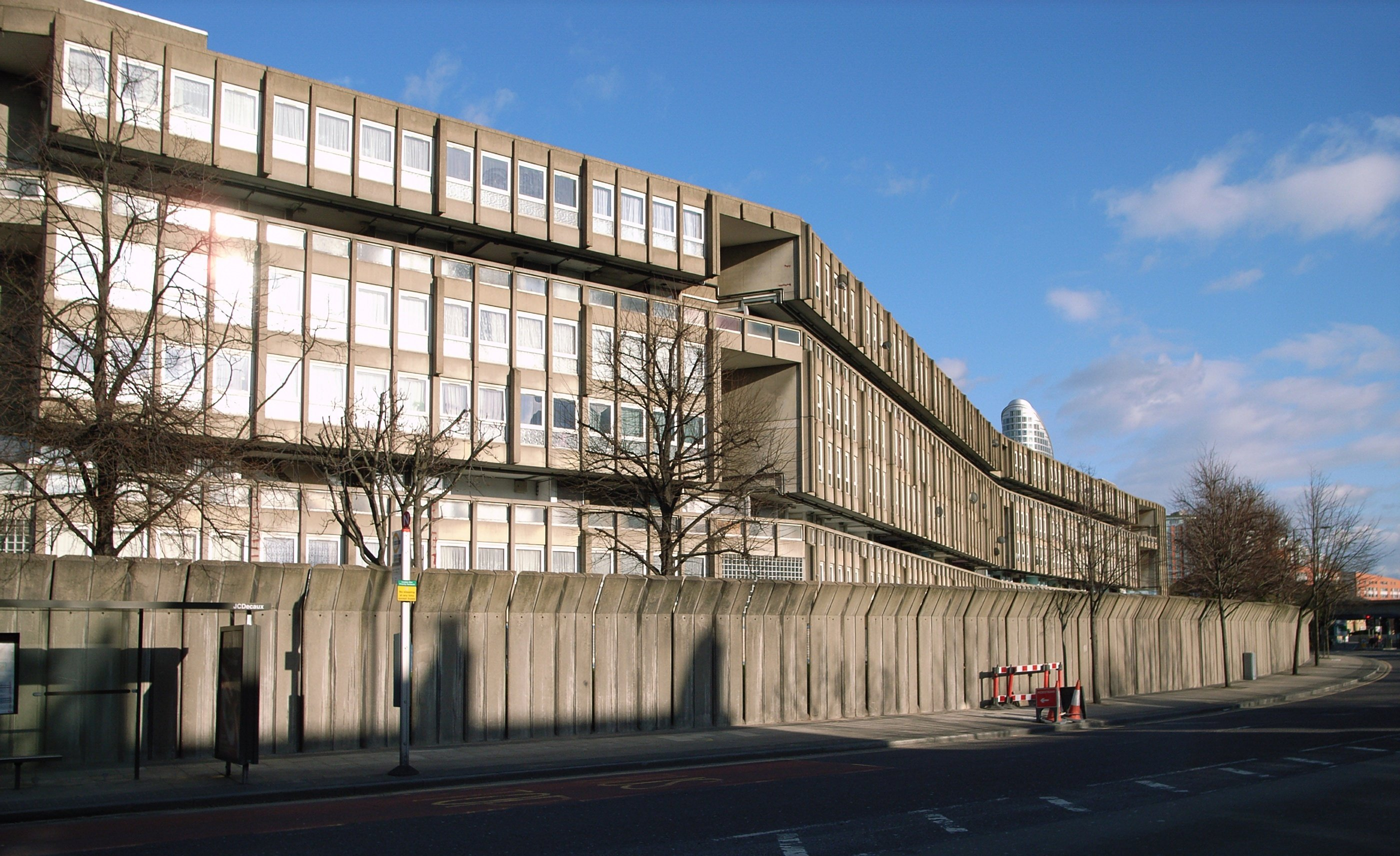
- Robin Hood Gardens
- Interactive map of Robin Hood Gardens

General information
- Location: Poplar, Tower Hamlets, London, England
- Coordinates: 51.50944°N 0.00843°W
- Status: Both blocks demolished

Construction
- Constructed: 1972

Listing
- Demolished: 2017–2018 (Western block) 2024-March 2025 (Eastern block)

Other information
- Governing body: Tower Hamlets

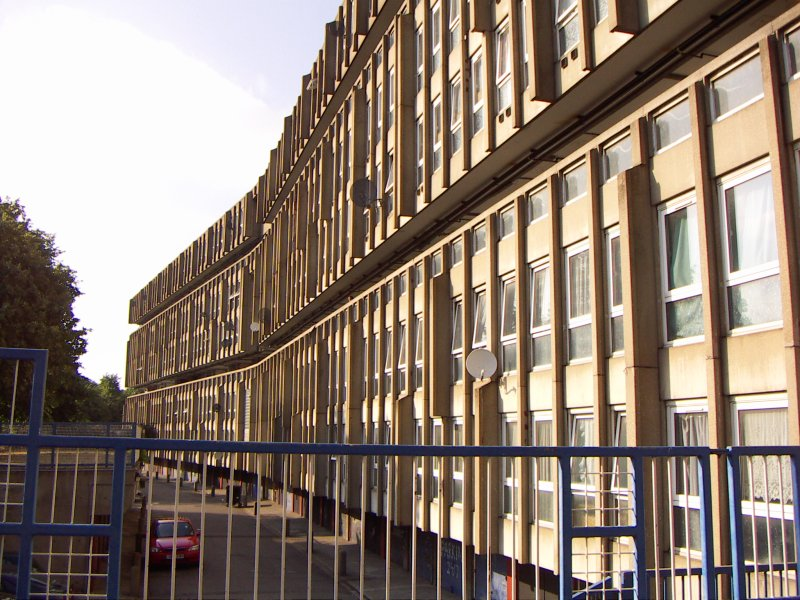
Robin Hood Gardens

Robin Hood Gardens was a residential estate in Poplar, London, designed in the late 1960s by architects Alison and Peter Smithson and completed in 1972. It was built as a council housing estate with homes spread across 'streets in the sky': social housing characterised by broad aerial walkways in long concrete blocks, much like the Park Hill estate in Sheffield; it was informed by, and a reaction against, Le Corbusier's Unité d'Habitation. The estate was built by the Greater London Council, but subsequently the London Borough of Tower Hamlets became the landlord.

The scheme, the first major housing scheme designed by the Smithsons, consisted of two blocks, one of ten and one of seven storeys, nurturing between them a large green; it embodied ideas first published in their failed attempt to win the contract to build the Golden Lane Estate in the City of London.

A redevelopment scheme, known as Blackwall Reach, involves the demolition of Robin Hood Gardens as part of a wider local regeneration project that was approved in 2012. An attempt supported by a number of notable architects to head off redevelopment by securing listed status for the estate was rejected by the government in 2009. Demolition of the western block began in December 2017 and was completed in 2018. Demolition of the Eastern block started in mid 2024 and finished in March 2025.

Part of the building has been preserved by the Victoria and Albert Museum and was presented at the Venice Architecture Biennale in 2018.

== Location ==
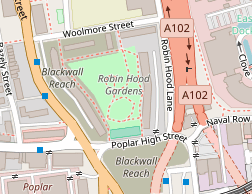

The Robin Hood Gardens estate was on a tight site, in Poplar, in east London. To the south is Poplar High Street, and then the A1261; to the north Woolmore Street, then the A13 East India Dock Road; to the west is Cotton Street, which links the A13 to the Isle of Dogs, while to the east is Robin Hood Lane and the A102 Blackwall Tunnel Northern Approach Road.

In 1885, the insanitary back-to-back slums were replaced by seven tenement blocks known as the Grosvenor Buildings. These were demolished in 1965, whereupon 5 acres (2.0 ha) became available linking other brownfield space.

The complex was at the north end of the Blackwall Tunnel, where a station of the Docklands Light Railway was built in the 1990s to link the City of London to Canary Wharf. It was within sight of the nearby Balfron Tower, both highly visible examples of Brutalist architecture.

== Description ==
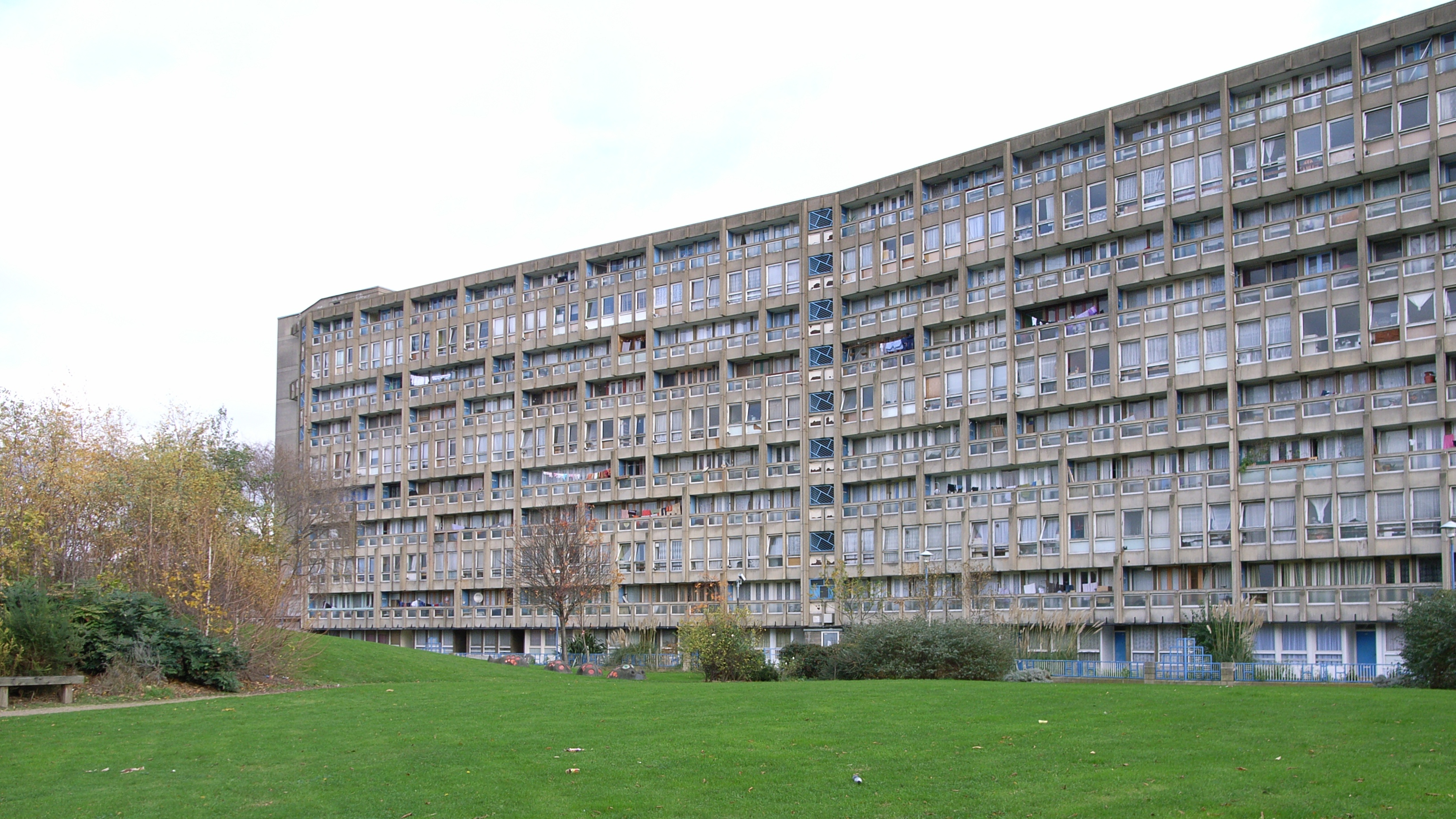
The west side (inner side) of the 10 storey east block

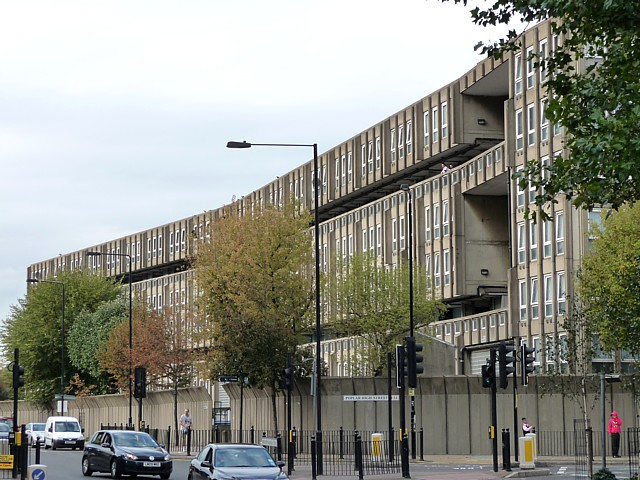
The west side (outer side) of the west block

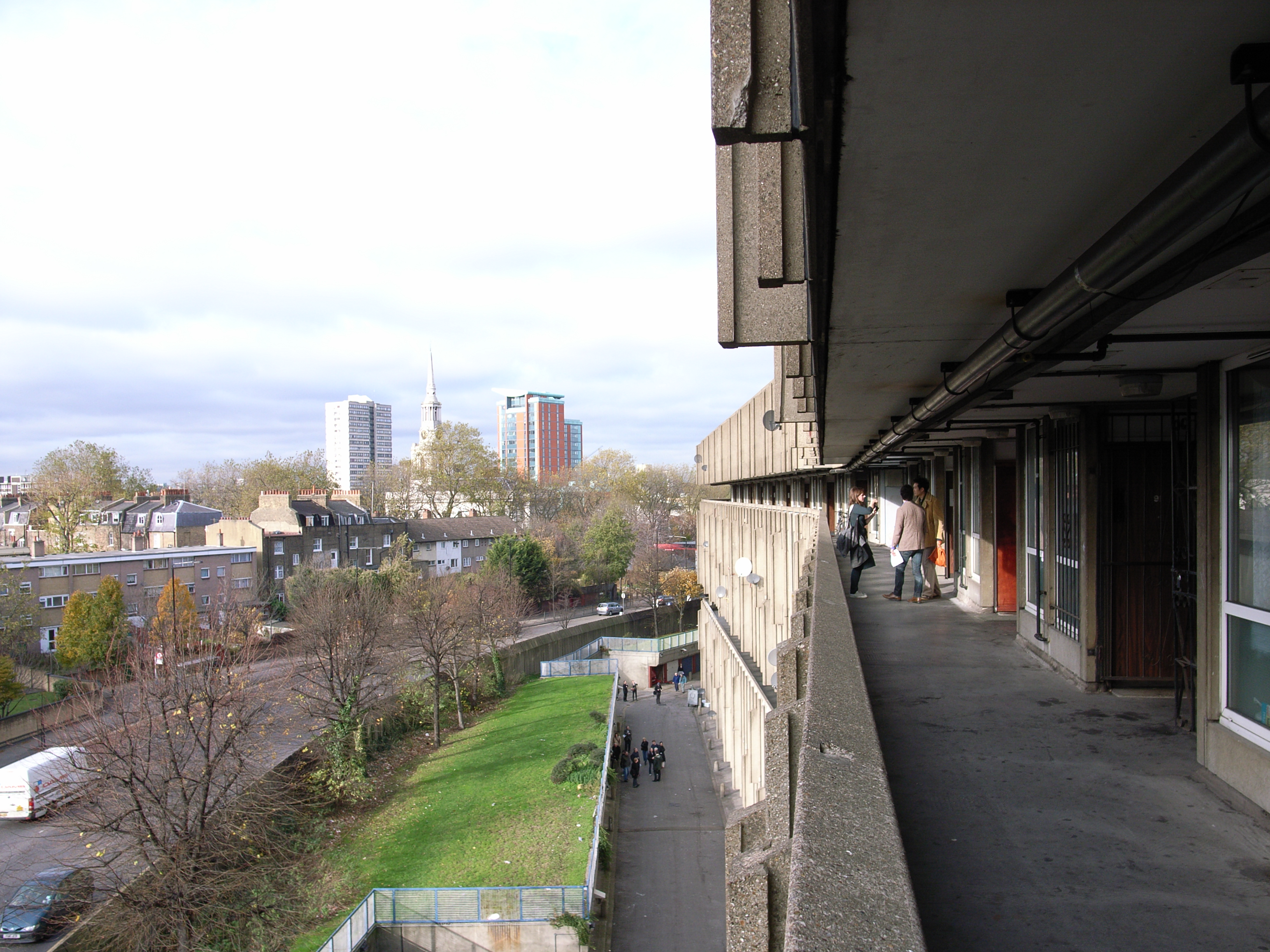
Streets in the sky, looking north-west across Cotton Street

=== Design philosophy ===
The Smithsons were influential architects from the Architectural Association group, who had failed to win the Golden Lane Estate contract, but published and promoted their radical design. They proposed that the building was not the fundamental unit of architecture but it was the network of pathways that was. They did not place buildings on a fixed rectilinear grid as was normal for modernist buildings, but on pathways used by the residents. They saw the needs of the pedestrian were different from those of the motorist and the service vehicle. Pathways in the sky had been used before by architects, such as Michiel Brinkman's Spangenblok Housing (1919) in Rotterdam, but it was tied to the existing street pattern, and the pathways the Smithsons proposed to use in Golden Lane were independent and non-rectilinear. Robin Hood Gardens was a physical implementation of these earlier principles, but as part of a design that favoured 'protection', in response to the traffic-bound site, rather than the 'connection' of Golden Lane.

=== Estate ===
The estate consisted of two long curved blocks facing each other across a central green space, and in total covered 1.5 hectares (3.7 acres). The blocks were of ten storeys (east) and seven storeys (west), built from precast concrete slab blocks and contained 213 flats. Construction began in 1968, the first flats opened in 1971, and the scheme as a whole was completed in 1972 at a cost of £1,845,585. In the central green area was a small man-made hill.

=== Living space ===
The flats themselves were a mixture of single-storey apartments and two-storey maisonettes, with two to six bedrooms. The maisonettes were designed with the bedrooms facing inwards shielding the residents from the traffic noise. Another design feature was the wide balconies (the "streets") on every third floor, the concept being to provide public space which would encourage interaction. Alcoves called "pause spaces" were provided next to the entrance doorways on the "streets" which the Smithsons hoped the residents would personalise and where children would play. As with many other council housing blocks in the United Kingdom, tenures diversified somewhat and included social housing tenants, leaseholders who exercised the right to buy and subsequent private owners, and private tenants of leaseholders.

== Reception ==
The "streets in the sky" concept has both been revered by architects and had some criticism in practice. The walkways and especially the enclosed stairwells contained numerous blind spots, including the alcoves in front of doors. Unlike a true city street, there was a lack of regular passers-by to act as a deterrent to crime and disorder. This is the concept referred to as "eyes on the street" by Jane Jacobs in The Death and Life of Great American Cities. This was because the walkways were not thoroughfares and mostly ended with an above-ground dead end. As a result, the walkways were seen to benefit anti-social behaviour. This view has been contested in a recent book about the estate, where residents talk enthusiastically about the social and sensory qualities and uses of the streets in the sky, in marked contrast to the cramped internal corridors and private balconies of the replacement development. Similarly, a specific retired tenant felt that living on the estate was often very ordinary, that "these tactile, these daily things are what need to be cherished, need to be understood and not over-intellectualised".

The exposed concrete weathered poorly, and by the time of demolition was in poor condition. The site was also cut off from its surroundings by roads, and the design decision to turn the entire development inwards.

A doctoral thesis from 1982 observes a mixed view that some aesthetic aspects of the building succeeded but ultimately "the Smithsons made the fundamental mistake of building for the present and not for the future. They were so intent, on putting their idea of 'street' into practice, that they missed a golden opportunity of making a real, lasting, contribution to the everyday lives of the East End working-class". However, residents themselves testified to the estate's rich communal life and the qualities of its architectural forms and spaces: its streets in the sky, elevated up in the open-air, with their extraordinary views across east London; the light-infused, dual-aspect apartments; and the central green and its mound as a site of children's play and access to nature, protected from the tumult of the surrounding roads.

J. Cunha Borges and T. Marat-Mendes, reflecting on Robin Hood Gardens in 2019 believed that "Streets-in-the-sky were a sensible alternative to towerblocks without resorting to low density. Their collectivist overtones made them seductively democratic", that reasonings for the destruction of the estate were against risks of violence but "the belief in a democratic aesthetics and the poetic longing for streets that run across a symbolic sky are lost as well".

Architect Richard Rogers described the estate as similar to a Nash terrace and that it was "one of the most outstanding social housing buildings in Britain".

== Redevelopment plans ==
The Council declared the site to be part of a larger regeneration area named Blackwall Reach, bounded by East India Dock Road to the north, the Blackwall Tunnel Northern Approach (A102) and East India Docks to the east, Aspen Way to the south and Cotton Street to the west. It plans to provide 1,575 new homes across an expanded area along with improvements to the primary school, a new park and other community facilities. 698 of the units (45%) will be "affordable".

In April 2010, Tower Hamlets shortlisted groups of architects, housing associations and developers to undertake the £500 million project. Before the final announcement, the designs for replacement buildings were condemned in The Observer as "generic developers' fare, with... no sense of place".

Swan Housing Association was selected, with a plan to replace the current estate of 252 homes with up to 1,700, of which 700 would be for social housing and shared ownership. It would also include open space, community facilities, and better connections to the surrounding area.

The demolition plans were passed by Tower Hamlets Council on 15 March 2012. Final planning approval for the redevelopment scheme was given in December 2012.

There was a lengthy period clearing the flats of their residents — both tenants and owners who had taken advantage of Right to Buy. A case study published in The Big Issue magazine shows one owner was offered £178,000 by the council for her two-bedroom flat at Robin Hood Gardens, when an equivalent property in Poplar would cost £347,000. If she accepted a shared ownership proposal, it would be seven years before she regained full ownership.

== Preservation attempts ==
=== First campaign ===
A campaign was mounted in 2008 by Building Design magazine and the Twentieth Century Society to get Robin Hood Gardens listed as a historical landmark in order to save it from destruction, with support from Richard Rogers and the late Zaha Hadid; the latter counted it as her favourite building in London. However, English Heritage did not back the proposal, with its commissioners overruling the advice of its own advisory committee. This was because it did not fully meet the strict criteria for listing post-war buildings, and because the building's design had suffered serious shortcomings from the start, for the designers had been forced to compromise on various issues, including the width of the access decks. Then culture minister Margaret Hodge was also against saving the building, saying its "functional failures are fundamental".

The campaign to save Robin Hood Gardens drew very little support from those who actually had to live in the building, with more than 75% of residents supporting its demolition when consulted by the local authority. A resident's own survey, published in Building Design in June 2009, found that 80% of residents wanted it refurbished. In October 2009, opposition councillor Tim Archer (Conservative) accused the Council of ignoring maintenance problems to encourage residents to move out.

In May 2009, then Minister of Culture, Andy Burnham, reiterated an earlier government decision not to list the estate and also granted a Certificate of Immunity from listing, meaning that the structure could not be reconsidered for listing for at least five years. This ministerial decision endorsed the recommendation of English Heritage that Robin Hood Gardens "fails as a place for human beings to live" and did not deserve statutory heritage protection, leaving the way open for Tower Hamlets Council to proceed with its demolition and redevelopment.

=== Second campaign ===
After the expiry of a five-year listing immunity, a second application to have it listed was made by the Twentieth Century Society and again was supported by many architects, including the Smithsons' son Simon Smithson; this was rejected by Historic England in 2015. Demolition of the western block began in August 2017 with the Eastern block demolition starting in 2024, and ending in March 2025.

=== V&A preservation ===
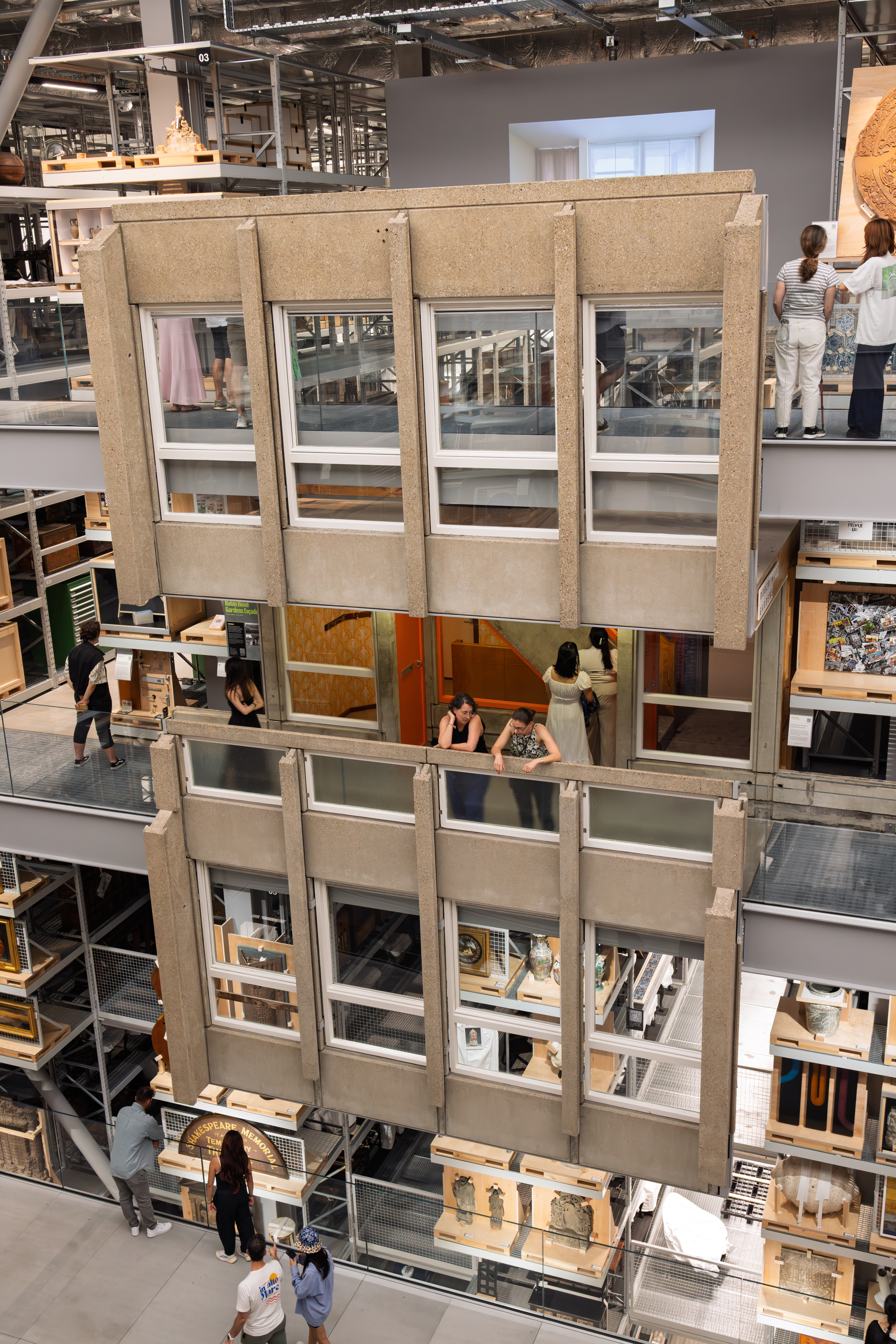
Preserved section of facade at V&A East Storehouse

The Victoria and Albert Museum has salvaged a three-storey section of Robin Hood Gardens. It has added two sections of the estate's garden and street-facing façades, including one of its elevated walkways that were central to the Smithsons' "streets in the sky" concept. The section of the façade reaches almost 9 m (30 ft) in height and 5.5 m (18 ft) in width, representing a full section of the repeating pattern of prefabricated parts that form the buildings' faces. Original fittings, including cabinetry that forms some of the interior walls, are included. The preserved section is on display at V&A East Storehouse.

== The Smithsons on their work ==
The project was the subject of a BBC documentary The Smithsons on Housing (1970), made by B. S. Johnson, in which both Smithsons are interviewed. The Smithsons reflected on the role of the architect, and how in the 20th century they have been required to implement several visions. In the 1920s, the need had been for garden cities isolated from the industrialised city, this was followed for the need for sun filled high-rise flats isolated and separated from the services on the ground. To reconnect families with each other, the Smithsons designed streets in the air that were to emulate the terraced housing of the Georgian period; they would, by design, block out the noise and look over a green central communal area.

Although Peter Smithson admitted he had been driven by a combination of urgency, practicality and idealism, he claimed in a 1990s interview that the project had failed, although he largely blamed social issues rather than architectural ones for this failure.

"In other places you see doors painted and pot plants outside houses, the minor arts of occupation, which keep the place alive. In Robin Hood you don't see this because if someone were to put anything out people will break it".

Asked why he felt this was the case, Smithson cited "social jealousy".

In contrast, an online photography exhibition chronicling the lived experience and architecture of the estate in its last years before demolition shows residents' pleasures in inhabiting the estate.

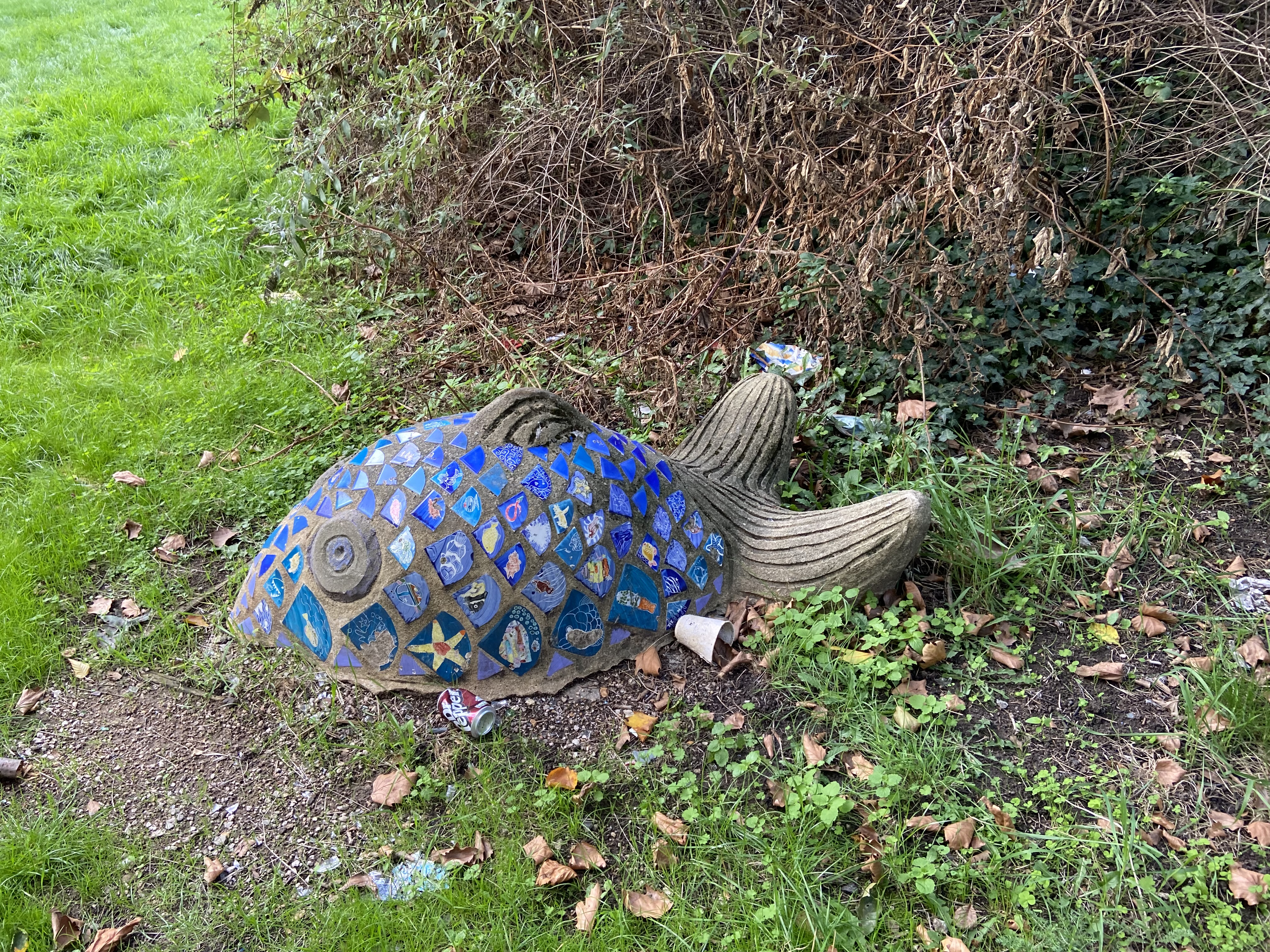
Mosaic Fish in the grass

== Robin Hood Millennium Green in the estate ==
At the turn of the Millennium, the central green with its distinctive hill was turned into a Millennium Green and various artistic features were added to enhance it. Once the estate was condemned, Natural England gave their permission for the Millennium Green to be given up and redeveloped. As of 2022, the developer's plans to have the green area reinstated are years behind.

== See also ==
- CIAM
