= Willmott Dixon =

British residential construction company

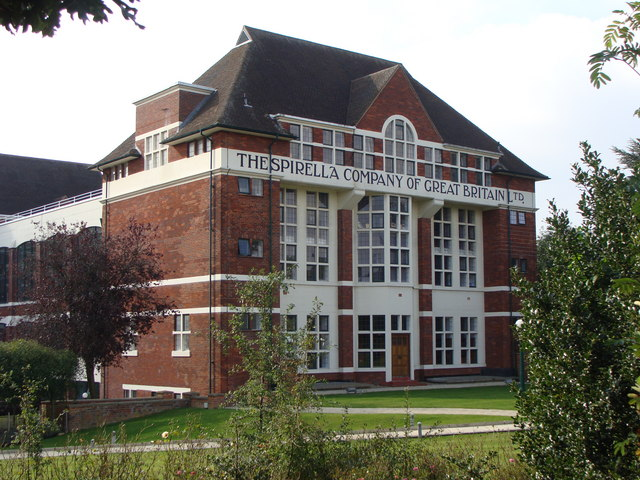
- Office at the Spirella Building, Letchworth
- Type: Private Limited Company
- Industry: Construction
- Founded: 1852, by John Willmott
- Headquarters: Letchworth, Hertfordshire, United Kingdom
- Key people: Rick Willmott, executive chairman Graham Dundas, CEO
- Revenue: ▼£1,101.5 million (2021)
- Operating income: ▲£22.9 million (2021)
- Net income: ▲£11.3 million (2021)
- Website: willmottdixon.co.uk

Willmott Dixon is a British privately owned contracting, residential development and property support business.

== History ==
The company was founded at Bassingbourn in Cambridgeshire by a bricklayer, John Willmott, in 1852. During the second half of the 19th century and much of the 20th century, the company remained small. Prior to 1987, the company was named John Willmott.

During 1975, the company opened its first building repair and maintenance depot; this business sector would prove to be a key area for the future of the company. By 1980, John Willmott was recording turnovers of nearly £30 million per annum. During the early 1980s, the company bought a motorhome, made by Winnebago Industries, from which to conduct board meetings at regional locations and thereby keep in touch with local management. Furthermore, the company decided to expand internationally around this time, setting up in both Egypt and Portugal.

Through the early 1990s, various public sector bodies, from local authorities to housing associations, issued numerous large construction contracts to the company. During early 1992, as part of parts to increase turnover by 50% within 24 months, Willmott Dixon created a new holding company, Willmott Dixon Housing, that oversaw two of its operating companies, Eastern and Southern, that primarily built homes for housing associations; another division, Willmott Dixon Housing Refurbishment, was launched to capitalise on growing demand within the refurbishment market; it sought to provide a specialist service for social housing.

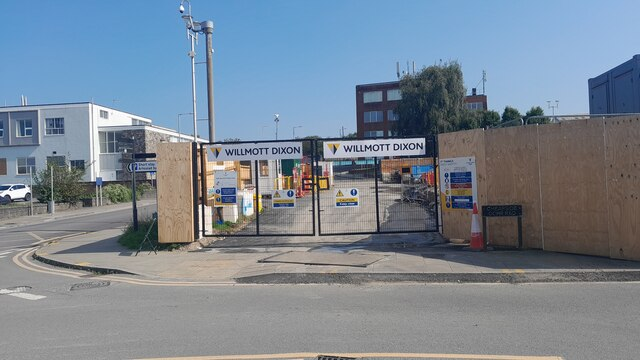
Construction site in Bridgend, Wales

During the early 1990s, the company made several acquisitions, such as of the Cheltenham-based firm Kalkare Property Maintenance and the Cardiff-based contractor Turner Western, as part of its expansion programme; in March 1992, it put further acquisitions on hold after pre-tax profits dropped to £914,000.

In 1998, Willmott Dixon recorded that its pre-tax profits for the previous year had nearly trebled, reaching £2.3 million.

During 2000, the company moved its headquarters from London to the Spirella Building in Letchworth. One year later, Rick Willmott became the fifth generation of the Willmott family to lead the business. During May 2005, Willmott Dixon reported that it had recorded record profits of £10.4 million; it stated its intention to expand its housing arm and that it would evaluate private finance initiative (PFI) opportunities.

During May 2005, Willmott Dixon opted to spin out its social housing business, Inspace, which it listed on the London Stock Exchange. However, in January 2008, the company re-acquired Inspace in exchange for £148 million. Following the reacquisition, Willmott Dixon opted to reshape its group structure and simplify the brands it traded under.

In 2009, the company was fined £4.5 million by the Office of Fair Trading over alleged bid-rigging within the company’s tenders across a seven year period. Two years later, several suppliers to the company publicly spoke out on their dissatisfaction of Willmott Dixon's introduction of several management service fees for routine tasks such as payment processing.

During March 2013, Willmott Dixon invested £1 million in the 4Life Academy, located in Perry Barr, Birmingham. That same year, it launched a new company to provide private rented accommodation for young professionals. During October 2014, the firm lost a legal challenge over the awarding of a £177 million contract to rival company Mitie by Hammersmith and Fulham Council.

In early 2016, the company put its support services division up for sale; the move was subsequently abandoned. That same year, it was announced that Willmott Dixon Partnerships changed its name to Fortem under a rebranding strategy that sought grow the company outside its core social housing market. Furthermore, the firm also merged its two residential divisions together; it was allegedly considering its floatation around this time.

In January 2024, Rick Willmott stepped down as group chief executive and became Willmott Dixon's new executive chairman; he was replaced by Graham Dundas, the former chief financial officer. Later that same year, the company reported a pre-tax loss before exceptional items of £5.2 million despite a record order book of £3 billion; this outcome was attributed to insolvencies in its supply chain.

== Operations ==
Willmott Dixon has several business streams including construction, residential construction and interior fit out and refurbishment. In 2017, it sold a 70% stake in its London-based residential development business Be Living to Malaysia's EcoWorld International, creating EcoWorld London.

== Major projects ==
Major projects involving the company have included:

- Runnymede Civic Centre, completed in 2008
- Aylesbury Waterside Theatre, completed in 2010
- University of Worcester Arena, completed in 2013
- Woolwich Central, the largest ever development by Tesco's in-house development business Spenhill, was completed in 2014. The development was named Britain's worst new building, being awarded the 'Carbuncle Cup' for a design judges described as "oppressive, defensive, arrogant and inept".
- Keynsham Civic Centre, completed in 2015
- The refurbishment and fit out of the Design Museum in Kensington, completed in 2016
- A specialist building in Exeter, housing the Met Office's new supercomputer, completed in 2017
- The redevelopment of Orchard Village in South Hornchurch, completed in 2017. Since its construction, Orchard Village has been beset with problems of build quality and estate management which have been reported in the media, in particular by the Romford Recorder
- The fit out of the new hospitality suite in the East Stand at Twickenham Stadium, completed in 2018
- The refurbishment of Alexandra Palace, completed in 2018
- Brentford FC's new Community Stadium at Lionel Road South in Brentford, London, completed in 2020
- Bassaleg School, Newport, completed in 2023

The company is also working with Poplar HARCA to redevelop Aberfeldy Village in Poplar, London, due to complete in 2024.

=== Fire safety provisions ===
Woolwich Central was the subject of a £46.7 million claim by Tesco against Willmott Dixon for cladding replacement; Willmott Dixon then sought to reclaim the same amount from five members of its supply chain: Lindner Exteriors and its subsidiary Prater, architect Sheppard Robson, AIS Surveyors, and fire engineer AECOM. When the case was heard in February 2023, two suppliers countered by saying the problems arose due to Willmott Dixon's negligence. The financial impact of the Woolwich Central project continued to be felt in July 2024, when Willmott Dixon said costs to fix the scheme had risen from £44m to £48m - a figure later revised upwards to £52m.

In June 2023, Willmott Dixon said its financial performance had also been adversely affected by costs associated with Building Safety Act compliance. CEO Rick Willmott said: "The aggregate provision for these legacy issues stands at a very material £62 million and we naturally expect to recover a substantial portion of this from designers, fire engineers, supply chain and insurers who, so far, have not faced up to their responsibilities or obligations across those 'in scope' projects." In July 2024, Willmott Dixon said it had recovered £6.6m of its building safety compliance costs and expected more successful future claims in the future; a year later, the company reported it had recovered £20m.

== Awards ==
The company was listed as No. 4 in the East of England Region of the mid range businesses of The Sunday Times Best Companies to Work For in July 2019. It also won the Queen's Award for Enterprise in 2014, 2018 and 2019.

== Subsidiaries ==
Willmott Dixon Holdings subsidiaries include:

Subsidiary name	Area of business
Willmott Dixon Construction	Construction company across various sectors
Willmott Dixon Interiors	Interior refurbishment and fit-out
Fortem	Planned and responsive maintenance to residential properties
EcoWorld London	Sustainable property development within London. Willmott Dixon hold a 30% share.
