= Catherine Yass =

English artist

- Born: 1963 (age 62–63); London, England
- Education: Slade School of Fine Art, Hochschule der Künste, Berlin, Goldsmiths College
- Known for: Photography
- Movement: Young British Artists

Catherine Yass (born 1963) is an English artist known for her wall-mounted lightboxes.

== Biography ==
Catherine Yass was born in 1963 in London. She studied at the Slade School of Fine Art, the Hochschule der Künste, Berlin, and Goldsmiths College. In 2002, Yass was nominated for the Turner Prize. She teaches photography at the Royal College of Art, London. She lives in London.

== Works ==
Yass is noted for her films and brightly coloured photographs. Many of her works are mounted on light boxes.

Yass has also worked with video. Descent (2002) is one film and two light boxes.

In 2000, Yass designed the Christmas tree for Tate Britain, and in the same year along with Richard Wentworth she designed the public square around The New Art Gallery Walsall. Yass has had solo exhibitions including Lighthouse at Alison Jacques Gallery, London (2012); a mid-career retrospective at De La Warr Pavilion, Bexhill-on-Sea (2011); Flight, The Phillips Collections, Washington D.C.; The China Series, Stedelijk-Hertogenbosch Museum, The Netherlands (2009); Descent, St Louis Art Museum, St Louis, MO (2009).

Yass participated in the 13th Montreal Photo Biennale (2013). Her work is in the collections of the Jewish Museum, New York, the Scottish National Gallery of Modern Art, and the Tate Britain. it is also in the National Museum of Women in the Arts collection.

In July 2014 Yass was refused permission to drop a piano from the 27-story Balfron Tower in Poplar, London as part of a "community workshop to explore how sound travels".
