= Poplar HARCA =

Housing association in London

- Type: Company, charity, housing association
- Industry: Social housing
- Founded: 13 September 1996; 29 years ago
- Founder: Steve Stride
- Headquarters: London, E14
- Area served: East London
- Services: Housing, community regeneration
- Revenue: £54.6 million (2016)
- Net income: £10.1 million (2016)
- Total assets: £506 million (2016)
- Number of employees: 300 FTE (2016)
- Website: poplarharca.co.uk
- Footnotes; Source: Statutory accounts

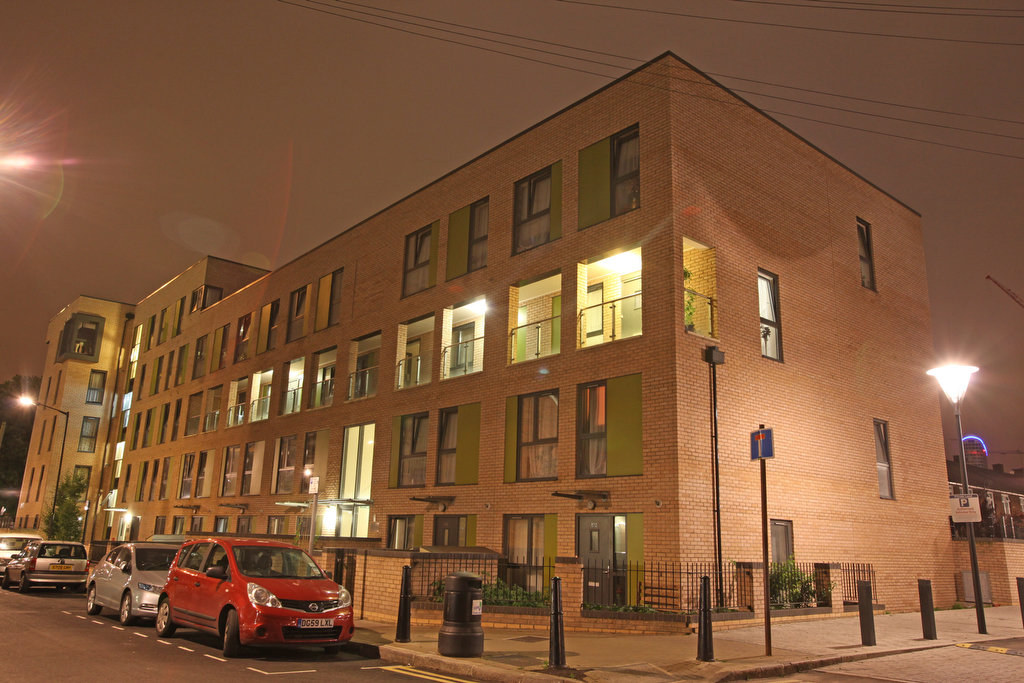
Brownfield Estate after redevelopment, 2014

Poplar HARCA (Housing and Regeneration Community Association) is a housing association in London, England. It is the landlord of about 9,000 homes in the East London area, a quarter of which have been sold leasehold; the remainder are let on assured tenancies at subsidised rent levels.

The association focuses on community regeneration as part of its core mission, with a Neighbourhood Centre on each estate. It is part of the Placeshapers network of housing associations and works on improving infrastructure, services, activities, employment, health and education in the area.

== History ==
Poplar HARCA was set up by the London Borough of Tower Hamlets to regenerate the area, especially certain council estates whose residents voted to transfer to the new body. Parts of seven estates (about 4,500 homes) transferred to Poplar HARCA in March and December 1998. The following year, tenants on further estates voted to remain with the council. However, after a lengthy consultation of all council estates in Tower Hamlets begun in 2002, several more estates in Poplar did transfer between 2005 and 2007. The final ballots were on several estates in East India ward, with a 78% majority in favour of transfer in 2006, including the iconic Balfron Tower; and Coventry Cross Estate with 65% in 2007.

=== Reshaping Poplar ===
Poplar HARCA has refurbished all its existing housing stock and brought it up to standard. Its "Reshaping Poplar" agenda is a twelve-year plan to update, improve and replace this housing, developing hundreds of new homes, alongside parks, health and education facilities. John Denham, Secretary of State for Communities and Local Government, met residents to discuss the plans in September 2009.

In 2012 Poplar HARCA and Willmott Dixon obtained planning permission for a joint redevelopment of the Aberfeldy Estate. The plans include the demolition of nearly 300 homes and their replacement with 1,100 new homes and improved amenities to be provided over twelve years. Of the 1,100 new homes built, 986 will be at market rates, 20 at intermediate rent, and 170 at social rent.

== Management ==
The constitution allows for twelve board members including seven resident directors (tenants or leaseholders), one local councillor and up to four independent members. As of November 2015, the Chief Executive is Steve Stride, the Chair of the Board is Dr Paul Brickell, and the Vice-Chair is Rev. James Olanipekun, a resident.

Poplar HARCA has also formally incorporated youth empowerment into its management structure. Its Youth Empowerment Board is formally represented in the governance of the association.

The Audit Commission's last inspection in 2007 awarded Poplar HARCA two stars out of three, with "promising prospects for improvement".

Poplar Harca's Community and Neighbourhoods team (CaN), often in partnership with other associations, work on projects that help residents to find new jobs, empower them to improve their local area or develop and improve their physical, mental, emotional, social and educational wellbeing.

In May 2025 it emerged that poor maintenance had left residents of Balfron Tower, a property owned by Poplar HARCA, but managed by a third party managing agent, without lift access for more than a week, in possible breach of fire regulations (under increasing public scrutiny following the Grenfell Tower fire). The situation only saw signs of improvement when the residents posted on social networking site Reddit, which was then picked up by local and national newspapers. Residents alleged they had been threatened by building management over the posts.

== Awards ==
- Winner of the 2016 Guardian Public Service Award for Transformation.
- In October 2016, the Accents Team were awarded ‘Innovation of the Year’ by 24 Housing for their Open Poplar project which identifies and then fills underused space in the area.
- Accents project manager Francesca Colloca won the 2016 Women in Housing Award for 'most effective project in improving the lives of women or communities' in recognition for her work on the Chrisp Street Exchange Programme.
- In 2016, Poplar HARCA ranked 4th in Inside Housing's Innovation Index, recognising the ideas and creativity of staff.
- 2015 winner of the UK Housing Award for ‘Outstanding Landlord of the Year’.
- In 2015, it won a BALI National Landscape Award in the Hard Landscaping category for its approach to regeneration on the Brownfield Estate.
- Poplar HARCA's Energy Champion Project was recognised for its innovative, resident led approach in receiving the Greener Living Award at the 2015 Community Impact Awards.
- In April 2014, Chief Executive Steve Stride was featured in 24Housing magazine's '2014 Power Player Top 50' list, at number nine.
- In 2014, resident Tom Gleed won Green Tenant of the Year at the Sustainable Housing Awards for developing Brownfield Community Garden into a thriving sustainable space.
- The Brownfield Estate Board won the 2015 Social Landlords Crime and Nuisance Group Anti-Social Behaviour (SLCNG ASB) Resident and Community Award for its work in building a safe and cohesive community.
- In 2013, it won the Sustainable City Awards in the ‘Greening the Third Sector’ category for demonstrating excellence in sustainable development.
- Poplar HARCA was voted Social Housing Provider of the year at the Sustainable Housing Awards 2013.
- Finalist at the UK Housing Awards 2013 for Community-Led Initiative of the Year. This was for the Poplar and Bow Network.
- It won two awards at the Sustainable Housing Awards 2012: Partnership of the year for the Eco Homes project and the Transformation Award for the redevelopment of Leopold Park.
- Poplar HARCA won the ASB ActionNet Award 2011, for innovative legal action to deal with "neighbours from hell".
- It won the Tenant Empowerment Team of the Year Award at the Chartered Institute of Housing's Housing Heroes Awards 2010.
- It won The Guardian's Public Services Award 2009 in the Housing and Regeneration category, for its Family Intervention Project.
- Community Safety Manager, Sarah Castro, was awarded an MBE in the 2009 New Year Honours list. This was for her work tackling anti-social behaviour in Poplar and Tower Hamlets.
- Poplar HARCA's chair from 2002 to 2009, Christine Searle MBE, was named one of the 25 most influential people in social housing by Inside Housing magazine in March 2009. She was one of the founder resident directors of Poplar HARCA, and her MBE was awarded in June 2004 in recognition of her community work.
- Winner of the Housing Corporation's 2007 Gold Award for Empowering Communities
- Finalist of Inbiz National Housing Federation 2006 Housing Awards - Best Neighbour
- In partnership with Lincoln Area Regeneration Group, 2006 Green Pennant awarded for Chiltern Green
- In partnership with Lincoln Area Regeneration Group, Highly Commended in Chartered Institute of Housing 2004 UK Housing Award for Best Led Community Initiative - Chiltern Green
- 2001 Commendation for Best in Community Regeneration - BURA Charitable Trust
- In partnership with Countryside plc, Burdett Estate renewal was voted Best Partnership Development in the 2001 What House? Awards
