= Hauptstadt =

1957 urban plan by British architects Alison and Peter Smithson

Hauptstadt was an urban plan designed by British architects Alison and Peter Smithson with aid from Hungarian architect Peter Sigmond. The design itself was part of an array of entries from multiple architects into the 1957 Hauptstadt Berlin competition. Its reinvigorated approach to architecture, especially in its attitude toward the idea of transportation and mobility, grants it an important role in the post-war period.

== History ==
Following the devastation of Germany after World War II, the country faced a long period of upheaval and reconstruction. In 1957, the government of West Germany came to the decision to hold an architectural competition to rebuild the center of Berlin, including sections belonging to East Germany in an attempt to unify the divided city. The Smithsons took this opportunity to expand their architecture to a much grander scale in hopes that they would be able to revolutionize the idea of the city in its focus on the pedestrian as opposed to the automobile.

== Architecture ==
The majority of housing structures contained within the plan for Hauptstadt were meant to be those created by the Smithsons for their Golden Lane project. By building the center of Berlin in such a manner, it would allow for simple expansion by way of the Golden Lane design. In using this construction, the buildings would stem out from central cores into cells. Aside from the cellular structure, the plan was also meant to be formed with interwoven layers; this method of urban planning was a popular Team 10 idea known as mat-building that can also be seen in the Free University of Berlin project by the architectural firm of Candilis-Josic-Woods. In doing so, Hauptstadt was made to change, itself representing a living, breathing organism. The Smithsons themselves had stated in regard to this approach and its cellular design that it would allow, “the feeling for change, so that buildings, roads and services can develop freely according to their own laws without compromising the development as a whole.”

== Functions ==
Hauptstadt was to be broken into various corridors, each with separate function. Encapsulating the city on one side would be what was known as the “Chinese wall of offices and wholesale houses," garnering its name from The Great Wall of China. The largest portion in the center of the plan was the “commercial city,” containing the greatest number of pedestrian corridors as well as shopping centers. This sector would be accessed via parking structures along its border, and their subsequent escalators leading to corridors themselves. In addition to shopping zones, this central area would contain a large circular “museum of technology” that would also act as an epicenter of management. In smaller segments adjacent to the “commercial city” was the house of government and ministry buildings dotted along its perimeter. Finally an administration sector operated on the rightmost side of the plan with its own separate parking structures.

== Mobility ==
Hauptstadt was to take the idea of the city to a brand new level in its relation to the individual. Keeping in the style of Le Corbusier, the plan was designed such that there would be separate pedestrian and automobile corridors, allowing for a greater sense of connectivity in that any individual will never experience the same thing more than once, shying away from automation of life. This space was meant to be experienced, giving its inhabitants a greater chance to encounter new and exciting things through its ease of use overall. By separating the sidewalk from the road, people could move freely on foot without fear of vehicles and vice versa for drivers. Escalators were to be used to access the pedestrian corridor from the street level. This dual-layer technique was meant to emphasize remnants of the city on the upper level, while still keeping with the new structures.
