= Glenkerry House =

Housing block in Poplar, London

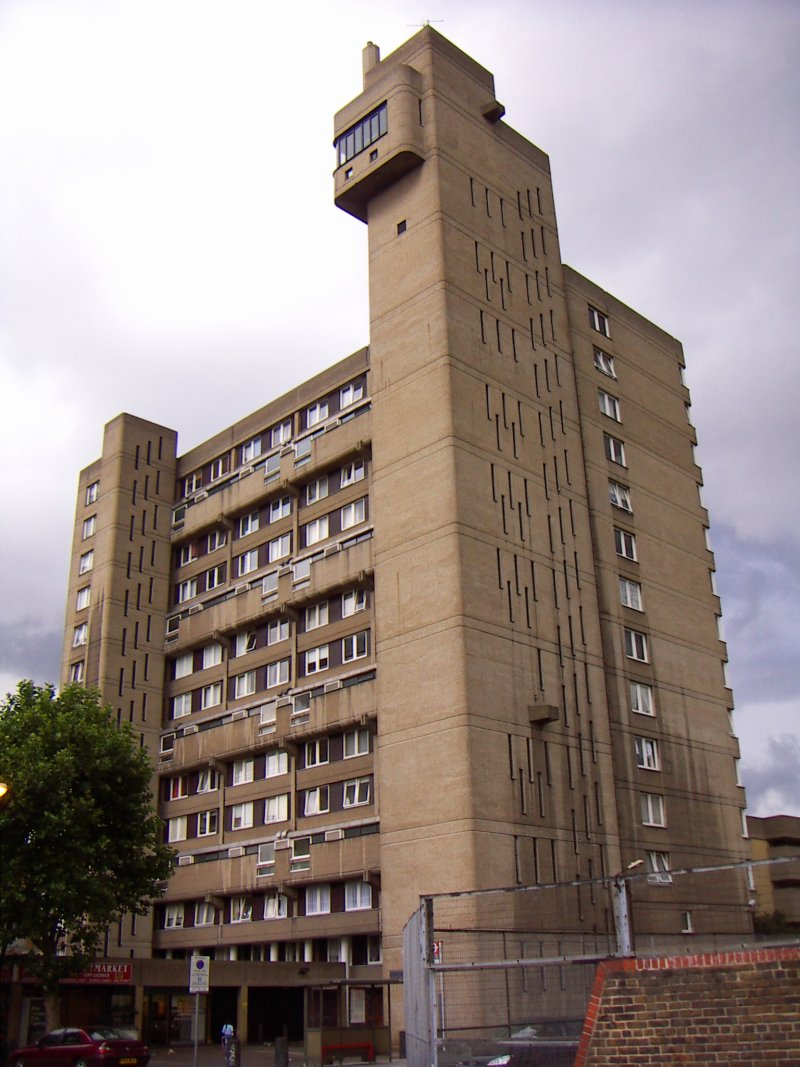
- Glenkerry House, a successful housing cooperative
- Interactive map of the Glenkerry House area

General information
- Status: Completed
- Type: residential flats
- Location: Poplar, London, UK
- Coordinates: 51°30′50.8″N 00°00′38.8″W
- Completed: 1977

Technical details
- Floor count: 14

Design and construction
- Architect: Goldfinger Studio

Glenkerry House is a Grade II listed housing block on the Brownfield Estate in Poplar, London, England, designed by the studio of the controversial Brutalist architect Ernő Goldfinger and finished in 1977. 14 storeys high, it stands in proximity to and complements the appearance of Balfron Tower and Carradale House, which were designed by Goldfinger himself and are now Grade II* and Grade II listed respectively. There are four four-bedroom maisonettes on the ground floor, 18 one-bedroom, 45 two-bedroom and 12 three-bedroom flats; 79 flats in all.

Its design and construction have proved to be of better quality than many other post-war high-rise blocks.

Since 1979 it has been run as a self-managed co-operative housing association and registered social landlord (RSL). Glenkerry Co-operative Housing Association (GCHA/GK) bought a 99-year lease from the Greater London Secondary Housing Association, partly funded by grants from the Housing Corporation and the Greater London Council, and raised about a third of the cost from sales to residents (members). The GLC also provided a loan for the remainder of the cost, which has now been repaid.

The freehold is now owned by the London Borough of Tower Hamlets. Members buy and sell the leaseholds of their homes at half the valuation, as assessed by the District Valuer.

The building is managed by a committee of its members, and research on housing co-ops in 1983 concluded that it was exceptionally well-run. Because this form of co-operative ownership does not allow the residents to increase their share and become full owner-occupiers, the Conservative government of the day did not give support to the model. Nevertheless, it is now widely regarded as a model for home ownership co-operatives, as it provides equity stakes that allow members to benefit from gains in the housing market, while locking in the subsidy so that the homes remain affordable to new members.

== See also ==
- Balfron Tower
- Housing cooperative
