= Rowland Atkinson =

British sociologist

- Occupations: Academic, urban sociologist, and author

Rowland Atkinson is a British academic, urban sociologist, and author.

== Career ==
Rowland started his career in the Department of Urban Studies at the University of Glasgow in 1997 after completing his doctoral research on gentrification and displacement in London. From there he moved to Australia in 2005 to direct the Housing and Community Research Unit at the University of Tasmania to 2008. In 2009, he became a Reader in Urban Studies and Criminology at the University of York. He has been working as a Research Chair in Inclusive Societies at the University of Sheffield since 2014.

His work focuses on the spatial manifestation of social inequalities in urban settings. In particular his research has examined changing urban and built landscapes as a result of wealth inequalities. He has been critical of policies that benefit the middle-income and wealthy groups at the expense of low income earners. Following work on social housing, segregation, urban violence and gentrification his research has focused increasingly on the impact of the super-rich on cities. In 2020 his book, Alpha City, discussed how the new housing and infrastructural landscape of London offered examples of the way that finance capital and the super-rich had 'captured' the city, rather than providing opportunities and investment for middle and low income residents.

As an academic, he is the author and co-author of more than 100 research papers in the fields of urban studies, housing studies, and criminology.

== Bibliography ==
- "Alpha City: How the Super-Rich Captured London" By Rowland Atkinson (2020) ISBN 9781788737975
- "Building better societies: Promoting social justice in a world falling apart" By Rowland Atkinson, Lisa Mckenzie, and Simon Winlow. (2017) ISBN 9781447332015
- "Domestic Fortress: Fear and the New Home Front" By Rowland Atkinson, and Sarah Blandy. (2016) ISBN 9781526108173
