= Alison and Peter Smithson =

English architects

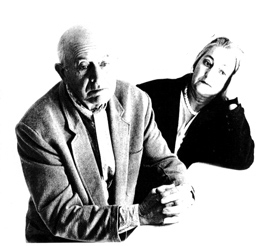
- Peter and Alison Smithson in 1990
- Born: 22 June 1928; 18 September 1923; Sheffield, Yorkshire, England; Stockton-on-Tees, England
- Died: 16 August 1993 (aged 65); 3 March 2003 (aged 79); London, England; London, England
- Occupation: Architect

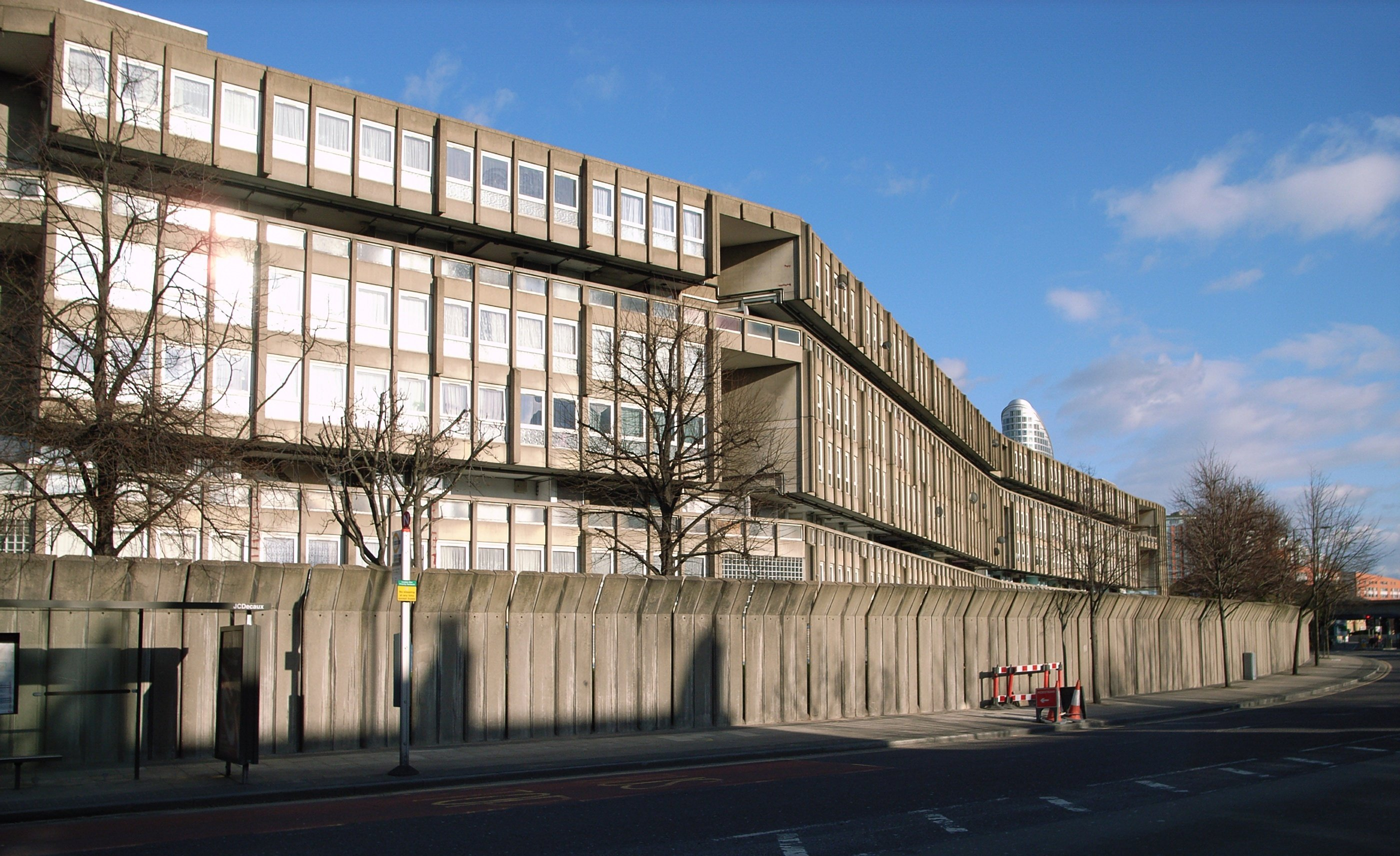
Robin Hood Gardens housing complex, Poplar, East London, completed 1972

Alison Margaret Smithson (22 June 1928 – 14 August 1993) and Peter Denham Smithson (18 September 1923 – 3 March 2003) were English architects who together formed an architectural partnership. They are associated with New Brutalism in architectural and urban theory.

== Education and personal lives ==
Peter was born in Stockton-on-Tees in County Durham, north-east England. Alison Margaret Gill was born in Sheffield, West Riding of Yorkshire.

Alison studied architecture at King's College, Durham in Newcastle (later the Newcastle University School of Architecture, Planning and Landscape), then part of the University of Durham, between 1944 and 1949. Peter studied architecture at the same university between 1939 and 1948, along with a programme in the Department of Town Planning, also at King's, between 1946 and 1948. His studies were interrupted by war: from 1942, he served in the Madras Sappers and Miners in India and Burma.

Peter and Alison had met at Durham, and they married in 1949. In the same year they both joined the architecture department of the London County Council as Temporary Technical Assistants before establishing their own partnership in 1950.

They had three children; one of them, Simon, is an architect.

Alison Smithson published a novel A Portrait of the Female Mind as a Young Girl in 1966.

== Work ==
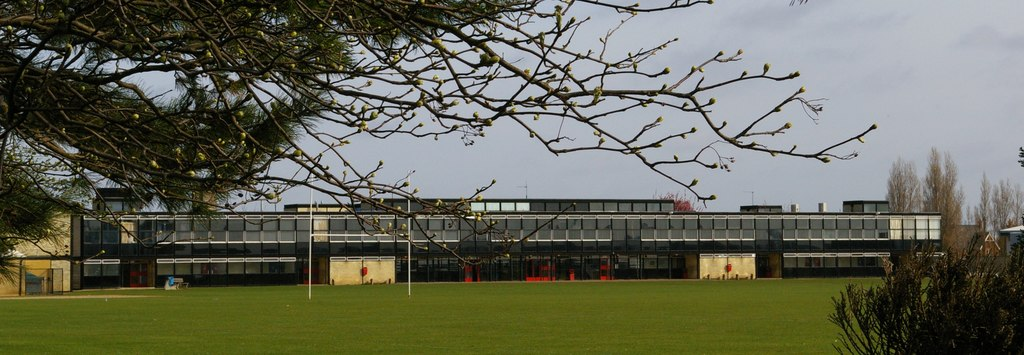
Hunstanton School, Norfolk

The Smithsons first came to prominence with Hunstanton School, Norfolk by winning the design competition in 1950. At that time Peter was only 26 while Alison was 21 and they had just graduated from Durham University. The school was completed in 1954, which used some of the language of high modernist Ludwig Mies van der Rohe but in a stripped back way, with rough finishes and a deliberate lack of refinement that kept architectural structure and services exposed. They are arguably among the leaders of the British school of New Brutalism. They referred to New Brutalism as "an ethic, not an aesthetic". It was a "brute" injunction to social relevance, "an attempt to be objective about 'reality'", its aim to "drag a rough poetry out of the confused and powerful forces which are at work". Their work sought to connect architecture with what they viewed as the realities of modern life in post-war Britain. Their definitions and interpretation of Brutalism put them at odds with their contemporary Reyner Banham, an architecture critic known for his work in defining the stylistic components of New Brutalism.

Alison Smithson articulated their desire to connect building, users, and site when, describing architecture as an act of "form-giving", she noted: "My act of form-giving has to invite the occupiers to add their intangible quality of use." As such, they turned against the formal unity of classical proportion and symmetry, governed by principles of geometry, to instead fashion architecture on the topological principle of "form in process" or "deforming form," governed by qualities of circulation, penetration, and thresholds, as most especially evident in their Robin Hood Gardens scheme. After the critical success of Hunstanton School, they were associated with Team X and its 1953 revolt against old Congrès International d'Architecture Moderne (CIAM) philosophies of high modernism.

Among their early contributions were 'streets in the sky' in which traffic and pedestrian circulation were rigorously separated, a theme popular in the 1960s, yet coined by the Smithsons in 1952 with their Golden Lane Estate competition entry. The Smithsons described places where "two women with prams can stop and talk without blocking the flow, and [these streets] are safe for small children, as the only wheeled vehicles allowed are the tradesmen's hand- and electrically propelled trolleys." This exemplified the use of the human figure in relation to scale, to better understand the visual representation of an unbuilt architecture. Another contribution of theirs was the "doorstep philosophy" which described that space at the entrance of a home "that provides tranquility for children's play."

They were members of the Independent Group participating in the 1953 Parallel of Life and Art exhibition at the Institute of Contemporary Arts and This Is Tomorrow in 1956. Throughout their career they published their work energetically, including their several unbuilt schemes, giving them a profile, at least among other architects, out of proportion to their relatively modest output.

Peter Smithson's teaching activity included participation for many years at the ILAUD workshops, together with fellow architect Giancarlo De Carlo.

National Life Stories conducted an oral history interview (C467/24) with Peter Smithson in 1997 for its Architects Lives' collection held by the British Library.

== Built projects ==
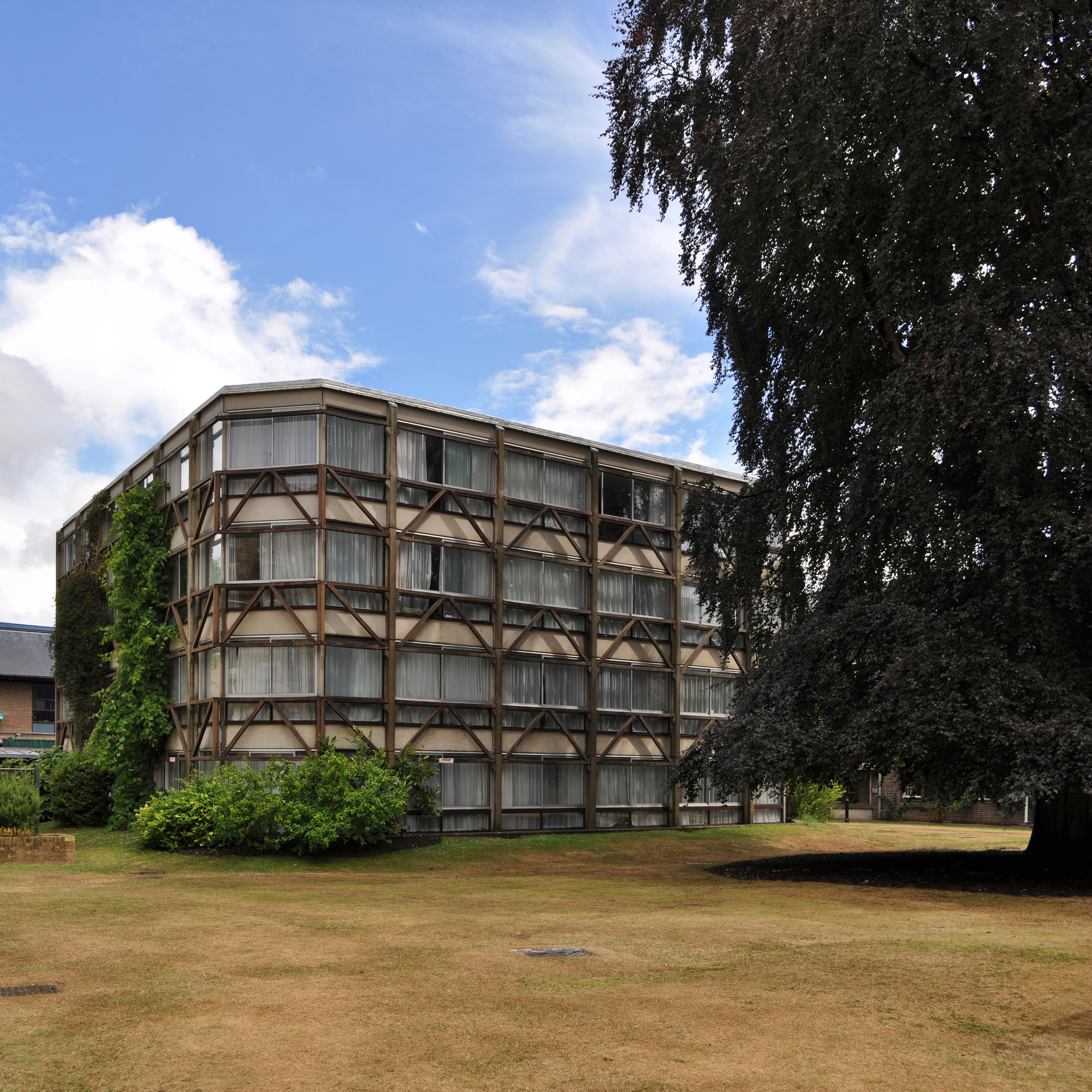
Garden building, St Hilda's College, Oxford (1968)

Their built projects include:

- Smithdon High School, Hunstanton, Norfolk (1949–54; a Grade II* listed building) Construction was delayed by the inaccessibility of steel during the Korean war. However, even during construction, the school was viewed as an expression of New Brutalism.
- The House of the Future exhibition at the 1956 Ideal Home Show. This "1:1 scale model of a prototype ideal house" was designed for the exhibition organized by the Daily Mail to demonstrate Alison and Peter's vision of an ideal home.
- Family house for acoustician and engineer Derek Sugden, Watford (1956). The initial design focused on providing the specific spatial needs and interior heights required for the different activities that were to take place within each area of the house. This proposal was rejected by both the client, engineer Derek Sugden, and Watford Town Council. The finial design that was ultimately built illustrated a more traditional morphology.
- Upper Lawn Pavilion, Fonthill Estate, Tisbury, Wiltshire (1959–62, once the Smithsons' home). This was utilized by the Smithsons as an experimental building where they could explore different applications of materials, decorative elements, and other small design adjustments that had not yet been widely adopted in the London area.
- Office tower for The Economist, members accommodation for Boodles, bank and art gallery, St James's Street, London – often known as the Economist Plaza (1959–65). In the Smithsons' design of this project, they chose to create three separate building, each with its own access to light and surrounding views. The buildings were constructed using Portland sandstone, a material rich in marine fossils. The three buildings surround a courtyard raised above pavement level.
- Garden building, St Hilda's College, Oxford (1968) St Hilda's was among the first Oxford colleges built after women were able to attend the University. The Smithsons' prioritized the need to highlight that in their design of the Garden Building. They aimed for the building to be clearly recognized "as a girls' place, as older colleges are so easily seen as men's places".
- Private house extension for Lord Kennet, Bayswater, London, 1960. The Smithsons' intent for this project was that the house extensions, which replaced the ruins of an older building, would give the house the appearance of "an upturned boat which was somehow converted."
- Robin Hood Gardens housing complex, Poplar, East London (1969–72). The Smithsons responded to the site being exposed to traffic on three sides by creating a central "stress-free" zone, with wall-like housing blocks designed to shield this area from the surrounding noise and traffic. The dwellings were oriented so that bedrooms and dining-kitchens faced the quiet central zone, away from the noise of everyday life.
- Buildings at the University of Bath, including the School of Architecture and Building Engineering (1988)
- Their last project: the Cantilever-Chair Museum of the Bauhaus design company TECTA in Lauenfoerde, Germany

Robin Hood Gardens was under construction when B. S. Johnson made a short film about the couple for the BBC, The Smithsons on Housing (1970). Sukhdev Sandhu, in a blog entry for the London Telegraph website, wrote that "they drone in self-pitying fashion about vandals and local naysayers to such an extent that any traces of visionary utopianism are extinguished." The finished flats suffered from high costs associated with the system selected and from high levels of crime, all of which undermined the modernist vision of 'streets in the sky' and the Smithsons' architectural reputation. In 2017, with the flats set to be demolished, a three-storey section including a walkway and maisonette interiors was acquired by the Victoria and Albert Museum.

They would go on to design several buildings at Bath, while relying mainly on private overseas commissions and Peter Smithson's writing and teaching (he was a visiting professor at Bath from 1978 to 1990, and also a unit master at the Architectural Association School of Architecture).

== Unbuilt proposals ==
Their unbuilt schemes include:

- Coventry Cathedral unsuccessful competition entry, 1951
- Golden Lane Estate unsuccessful competition entry, 1952
- Sheffield University, unsuccessful competition entry
- Hauptstadt, unsuccessful competition entry, 1957
- British Embassy, Brasília, competition-winning design, unbuilt due to financial constraints, 1961

== Bibliography ==
- Crinson, Mark, Alison and Peter Smithson, Historic England, 2018
- Boyer, Christine M., Not Quite Architecture. Writing around Alison and Peter Smithson, Cambridge MA, The MIT Press, 2018
- Henley, Simon (2017) Brutalism Redefined, RIBA Publications; ISBN 978-185-946-5776
- Powers, Alan (September 2008) 'Casework' The Twentieth Century Society: Robin Hood Gardens
- Risselada, Max; van den Heuvel, Dirk (2005) Team 10: In Search of a Utopia of the Present, NAi Publishers, Rotterdam, 320 pages. ISBN 90-5662-471-7
- Van den Heuvel, Dirk, Risselada, Max (eds.), Alison and Peter Smithson. From the House of the Future to a House of Today, 010 Publishers, Rotterdam, 2004 ISBN 90-6450-528-4
- A.R.Emili, Pure and simple, the Architecture of New Brutalism, Ed. Kappa, Rome 2008
- Webster, Helena (ed.), Modernism without Rhetoric. Essays on the Work of Alison and Peter Smithson, Academy Editions, London, 1997
- Vidotto, Marco, A+P Smithson. Pensieri, progetti e frammenti fino al 1990, Genova, Sagep Editrice, 1991
- Thoburn, Nicholas, Brutalism as Found: Housing, Form and Crisis at Robin Hood Gardens, Goldsmiths Press, 2022

Books

- Smithson, Alison. A Portrait of the Female Mind As a Young Girl: A Novel. Chatto & Windus, 1966.
- Smithson, Alison, and Peter Smithson. Urban Structuring : Studies. Reinhold U.a, 1967.
- Smithson, Alison, and Peter Smithson (with foreword by Nikolaus Pevsner). The Euston Arch and the growth of the London, Midland and Scottish Railway, Thames & Hudson 1968.
- Smithson, Alison, and Peter Smithson. Ordinariness and Light: Urban Theories, 1952–1960. MIT Press, 1970.
- Smithson, Alison, and Peter Smithson. Without Rhetoric: An Architectural Aesthetic, 1955–1972. M.I.T. Press, 1974.
- Smithson, Alison, and Peter Smithson. The Heroic Period of Modern Architecture. Rizzoli, 1981.
- Smithson, Alison, and Peter Smithson. The Charged Void: Architecture. Monacelli Press, 2001.
- Smithson, Alison, and Peter Smithson. The Charged Void: Urbanism. Monacelli Press, 2004.

Articles

- Smithson, Alison, and Peter Smithson. “Density, Interval and Measure.” Ekistics, vol. 25, no. 147, 1968, pp. 70–72.
- Smithson, Alison, and Peter Smithson. “The New Brutalism.” October, vol. 1, no. 136, 2011, pp. 37–37.
