= Aberfeldy Village =

Area of Poplar, London

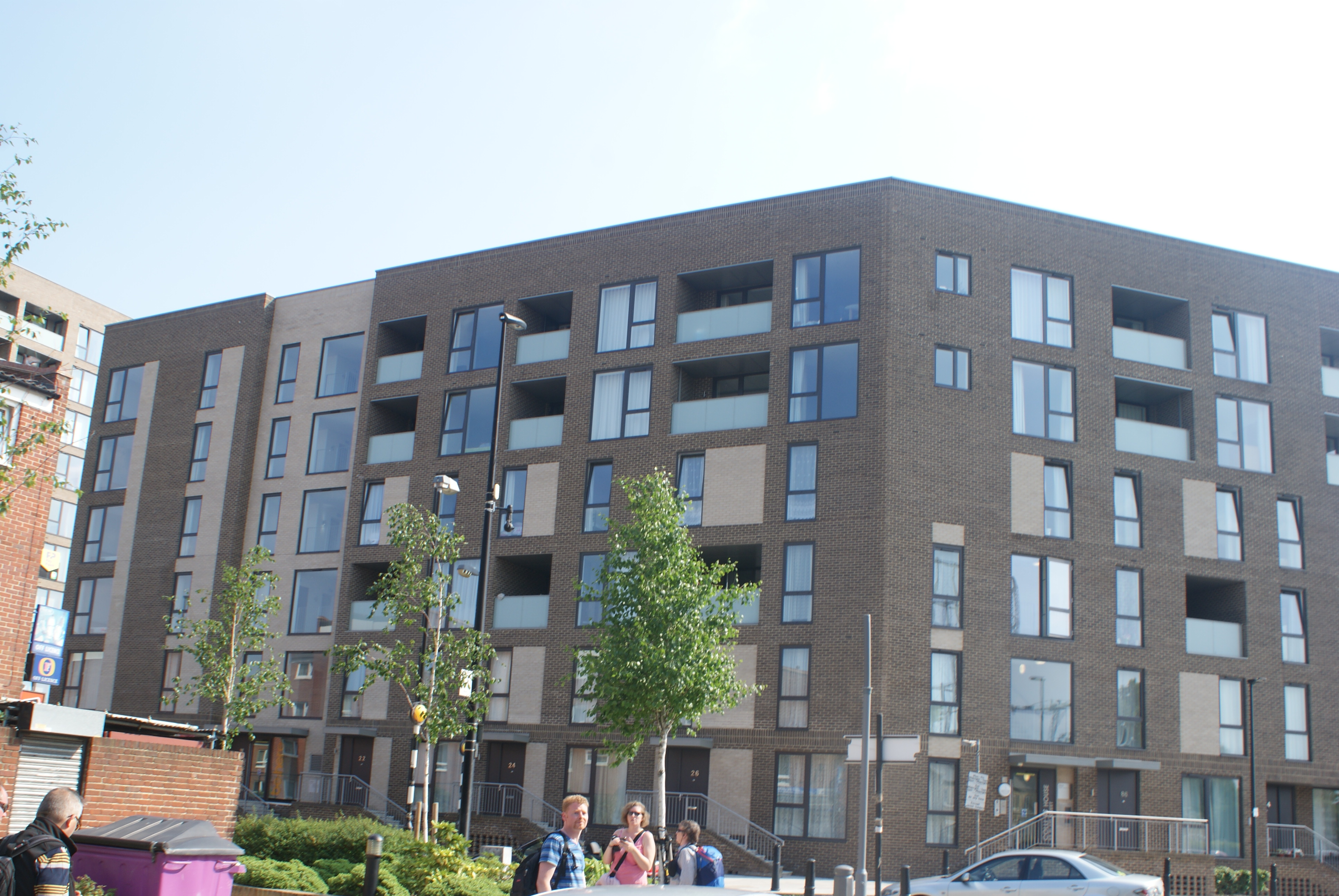
- View of Aberfeldy Village apartments from Oban Street
- Alternative names: Aberfeldy Estate

General information
- Location: Poplar, London, United Kingdom
- Coordinates: 51.513°N 0.006°W
- Landlord: Poplar HARCA

Website
- Poplar HARCA: Aberfeldy

Aberfeldy Village is an urban village in Poplar, London, England, which is in the process of being redeveloped in a joint venture between Poplar HARCA and Willmott Dixon. It was known as the Aberfeldy Estate, a housing estate but has expanded. It is sometimes referred to as Aberfeldy New Village in planning documents.

== History ==
=== Redevelopment ===
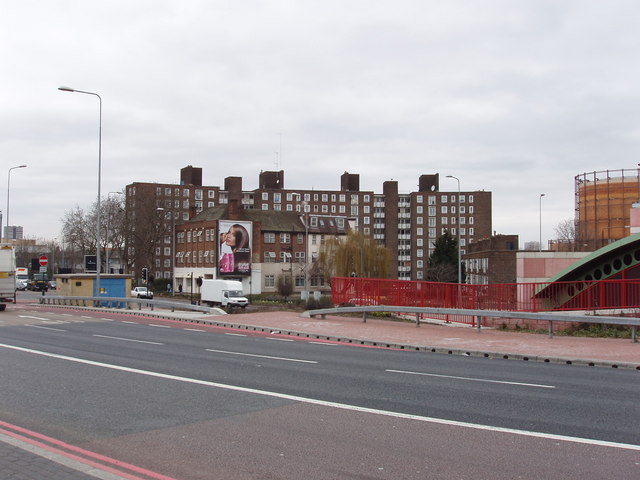
A former building in the Aberfeldy Estate viewed from East India Dock Road in March 2006

The area was originally developed with small terraced houses from 1864 to 1885, first by David Mclntosh, who named several streets after places in Scotland (including Aberfeldy Street after Aberfeldy in Perthshire), and from 1873 by the chemist turned developer John Abbott.

The site of the estate was located on what was the northern boundary of the East India Import Dock, famous for the importing of exotic goods during the 18th and 19th centuries. However it was heavily bombed during the Second World War and subsequently redeveloped into the Aberfeldy Estate.

It was built in various phases starting in the 1930s and continued after the surrounding area suffered wartime damage, being completed in the late 1970s. The estate and surrounding area suffered from severe social disadvantage with high levels of unemployment, low incomes, poor health and anti-social behaviour problems.

Poplar HARCA took over the running of the estate following its transfer into their ownership in two tranches, one in 1998 and another in 2007, as part of the council's Housing Choice programme. It has owned and managed the estate since the transfers. In July 2012, Poplar HARCA and Willmott Dixon obtained planning permission for a joint redevelopment of the Aberfeldy Estate.

The plans included the demolition of 297 housing units (211 units at social rent and the rest leasehold) and their replacement with 1,100 new homes (of which 170 will be for social rent, with 20 for intermediate rent and nearly 1,000 for market rent) and improved amenities to be provided over twelve years.

== Geography ==
Aberfeldy Village is situated on a triangular site bounded by the A12, A13 East India Dock Road and Abbott Road. It has in excess of 1,000 new homes and an energy centre, retail, community and health amenities, with public and green spaces.

The new homes are arranged around this linear green space in medium rise, high density buildings ranging from four to ten storeys. Lower, more domestic scale buildings sit adjacent to the neighbouring estate, whilst higher buildings along the A13 provide a degree of protection to this urban edge.

== Occupancy ==
The rental homes in the new development zone of Aberfeldy Village was at almost at full occupancy by residents in July 2016, who have an average income of £39,000 p.a. and an average age of 28.

== Culture ==
Bow Arts Studios has two studios, called the Aberfeldy Street Studios, which are converted out of two street front shops on Aberfeldy Street; the studios are designed to provide affordable working space for artists, designer makers or a public facing arts group.

== Education ==
The Culloden Primary Academy is a primary school located to the west of Aberfeldy Street on Dee Street and governed by the Paradigm Trust.

== Transport ==
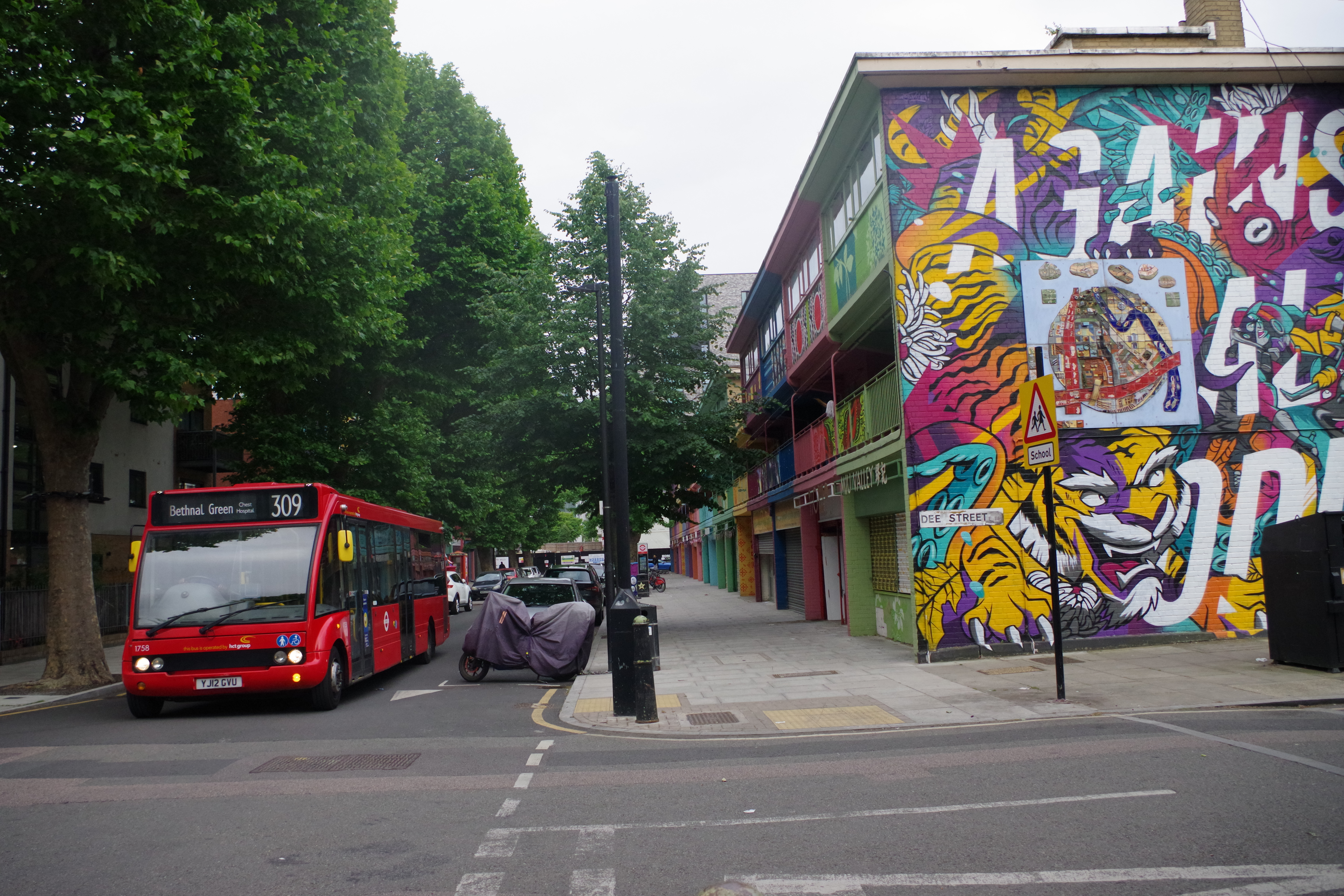
Route 309 bus passing Aberfeldy Street within Aberfeldy Village next to the local art mural adorning all the shops in June 2022.

Aberfeldy Village is connected to central London via East India DLR station that serves Bank as well as Tower Gateway stations. It is also close to Canning Town Underground station served by Jubilee line as well as the DLR. Aberfeldy Village is connected to London Buses routes 309 on Aberfeldy Street and Blair Street and 115, N15, N550, N551 on East India Dock Road and D8 on the A12 Blackwall Tunnel Northern Approach.
