= Coventry Cross Estate =

Housing estate in Bromley-by-Bow, London

Coordinates: 51.5229°N 0.0114°W

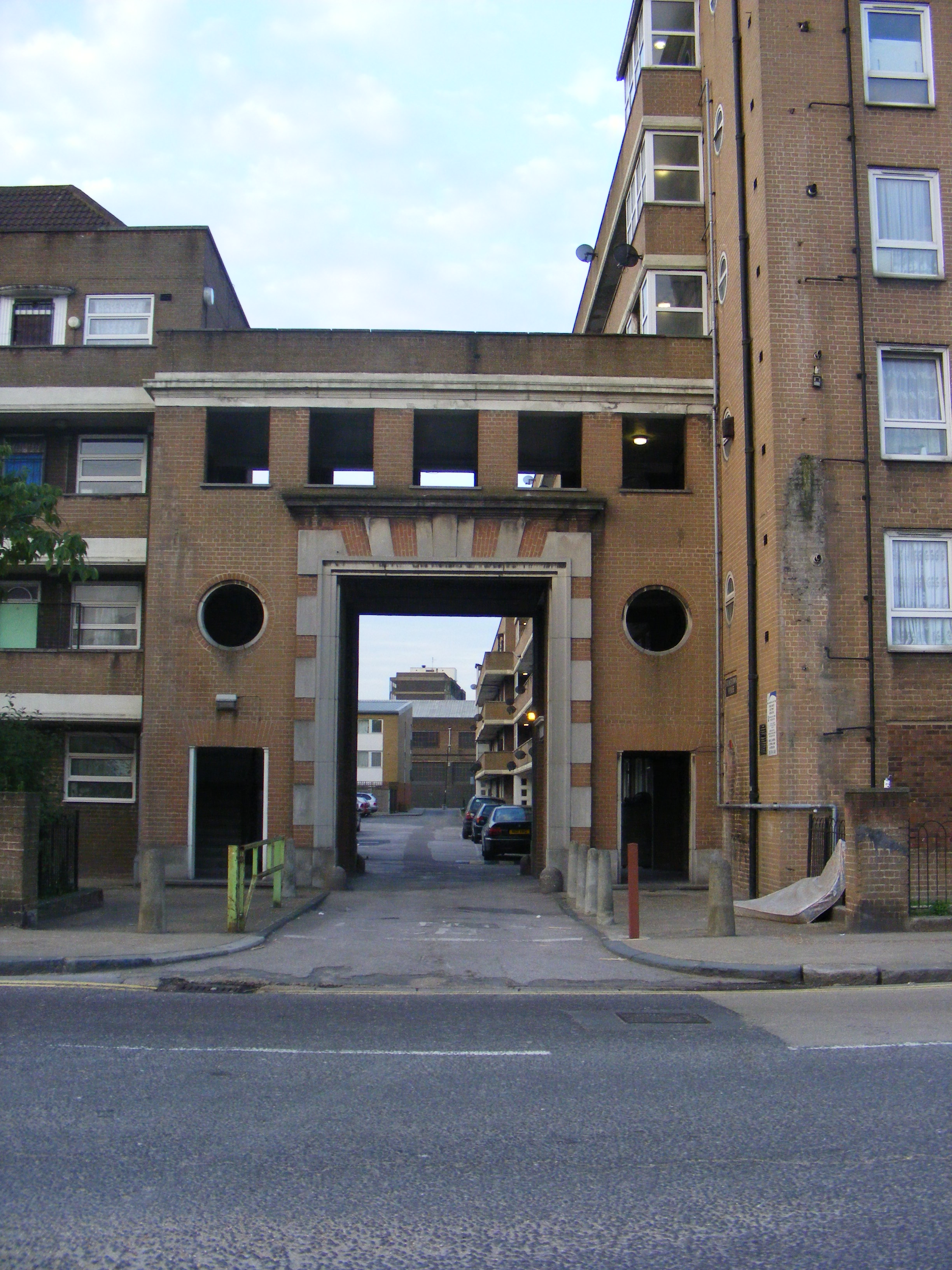
A residential block on the Coventry Cross West estate, in 2009

Coventry Cross Estate is a social housing estate in Bromley by Bow area of London.

== History ==
The name Coventry Cross dates back to a public house by that name. Local historians have suggested that the name may have originated with a pre-Reformation cross belonging to a local convent, and that the name was corrupted over time to "Coventry Cross".

178 flats were built by the London County Council, on the east side of St Leonard's Road, opening in 1935. As well as the main block called Coventry Cross, there were three smaller blocks, Fuller, Philips and Tennant Houses. Flats in these smaller blocks originally did not have individual bathrooms, but each three flats shared one, along with an area for washing clothes.

The line of St Leonards Road became a major road, the Blackwall Tunnel Northern Approach (BTNA), part of the A102 and now the A12. In the early 1950s, the LCC built seven blocks of flats to the west of the BTNA, and named the estate Coventry Cross West.

Ownership of the estate passed in time to the Greater London Council and then to Tower Hamlets.

The original Coventry Cross and adjacent blocks were demolished in the 1990s. The remaining blocks west of the A12 kept the name Coventry Cross Estate.

The newer Western Coventry Cross buildings (Biscott House, etc) originally had laundry rooms on the ground floor adjacent to the lift for each building. In the late 1970s these were converted into additional flats.

In the 2000s, Tower Hamlets consulted the tenants of the estate over a possible transfer to a housing association, and they voted in December 2007 to join Poplar HARCA, a locally based social landlord. Tenants expressed a 65% majority in favour, although most leaseholders opposed the move. The transfer was not completed until 2009 due to negotiations over the amount of government grant to support the required refurbishment.

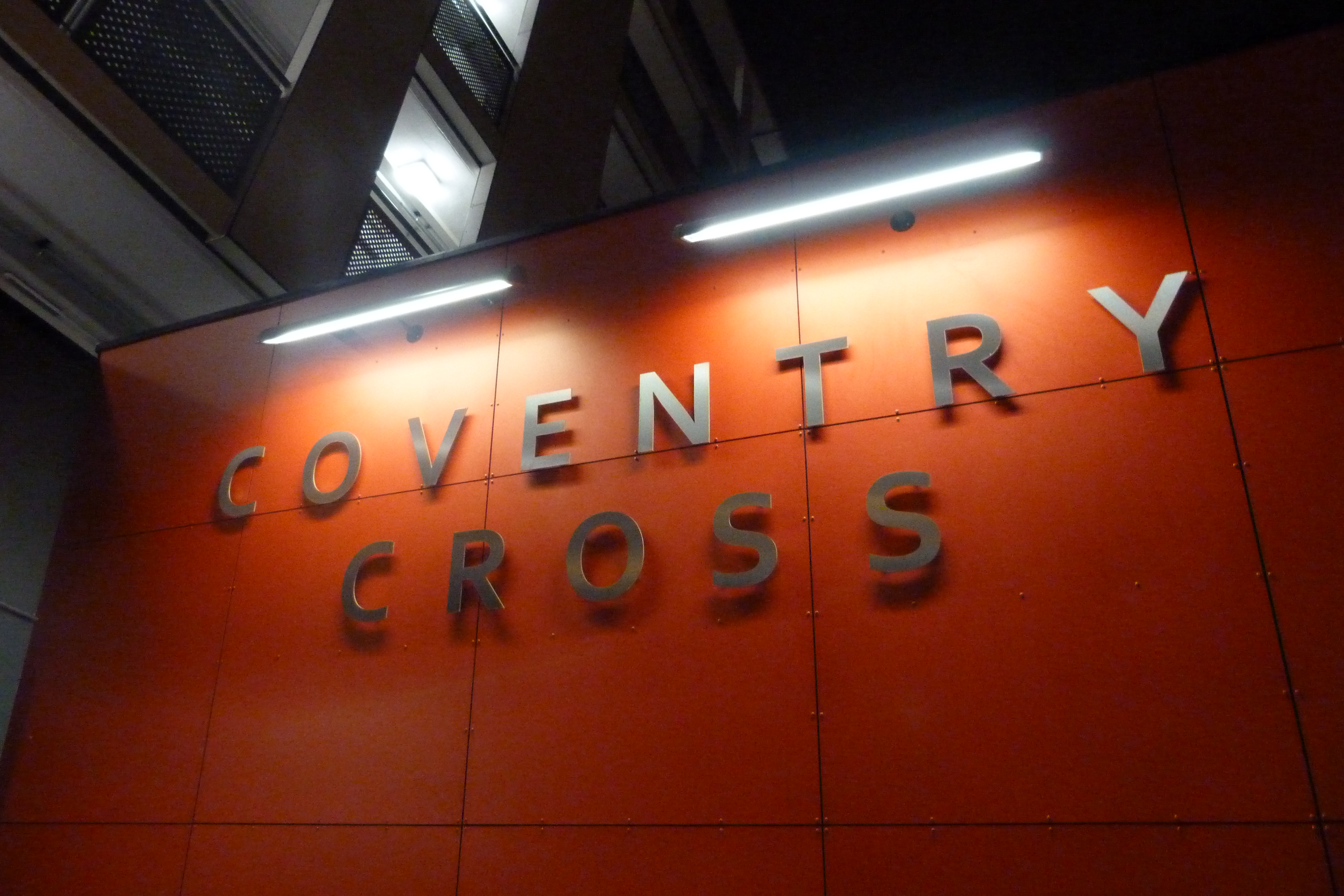
Modern estate signage in 2012

The works programme not only brought the houses up to the Decent Homes Standard, but achieved marked improvements in energy efficiency as well as security, landscaping and visual enhancements. Residents celebrated completion of the regeneration in October 2012.
