= Defensive architecture =

Defensive architecture can refer to:

- Fortifications, military constructions or buildings designed to defend territories in warfare and/or to solidify rule in a region during peace time
- Hostile architecture, a controversial urban design trend in which public spaces are constructed or altered to discourage people from using them in a way not intended by the owner
