= Camden bench =

Public bench designed as a form of hostile architecture

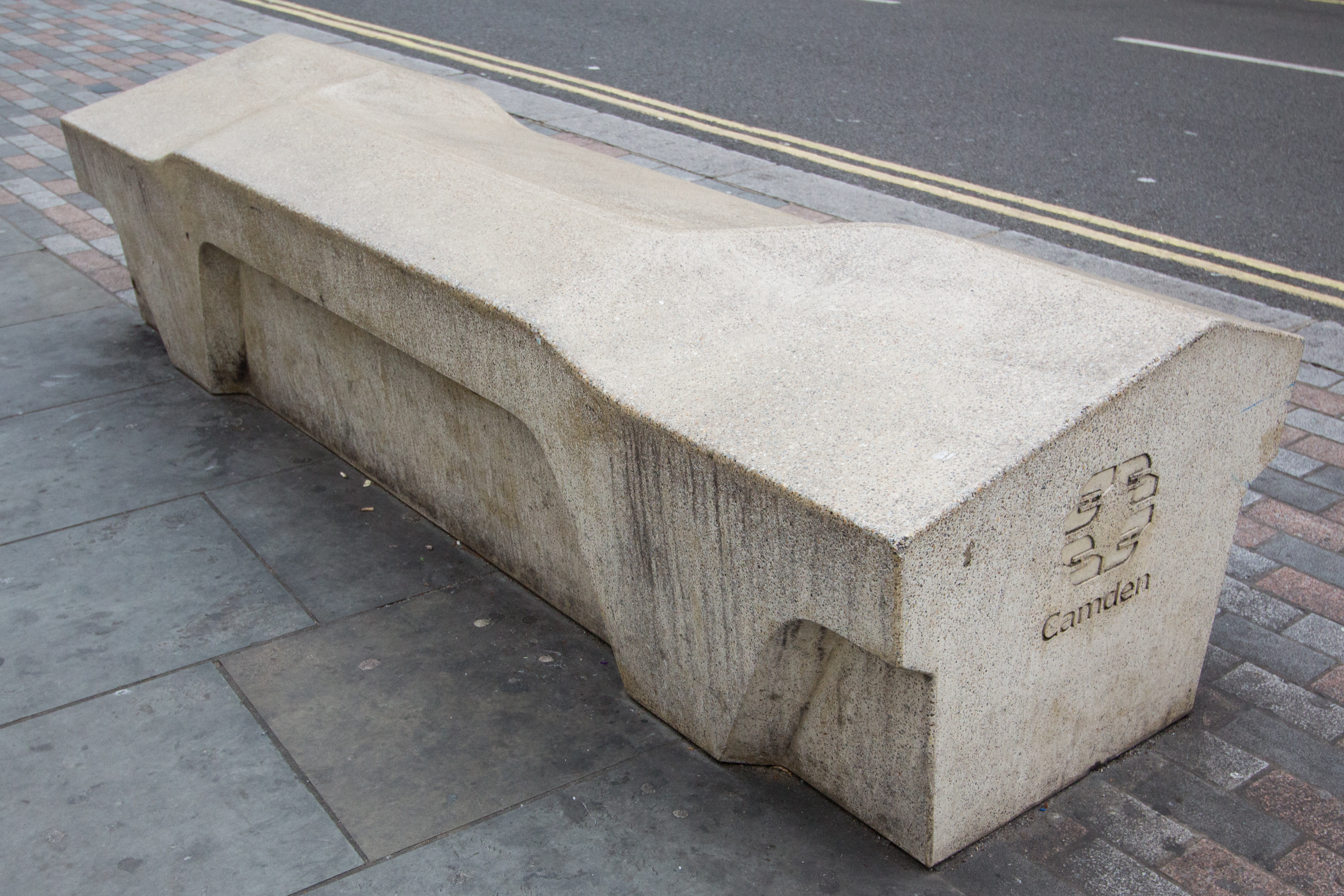
A Camden bench

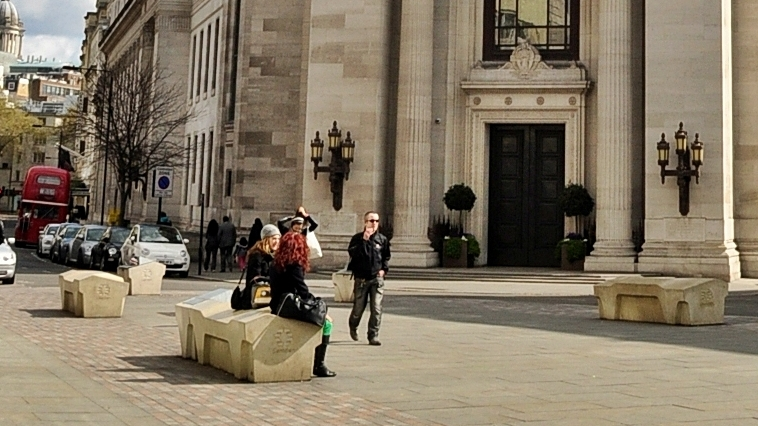
Camden benches outside Freemasons' Hall in Great Queen Street, London

The Camden bench is a type of concrete street furniture. It was commissioned by the London Borough of Camden and installed at a site in Holborn in 2012.

It is designed specifically to influence the behaviour of the public by restricting certain uses and behaviours and instead to be usable only as a bench, a principle known as hostile architecture. The bench has been called "the pinnacle of hostile architecture". Produced by UK company Factory Furniture, the bench is designed to deter use for sleeping, littering, skateboarding, drug dealing, graffiti and theft. Per design critic Kurt Kohlstedt, author of The 99% Invisible City:

The Camden Bench is virtually impossible to sleep on. It is anti-dealer and anti-litter because it features no slots or crevices in which to stash drugs or into which trash could slip. It is anti-theft because the recesses near the ground allow people to store bags behind their legs and away from would be criminals. It is anti-skateboard because the edges on the bench fluctuate in height to make grinding difficult. It is anti-graffiti because it has a special coating to repel paint. It can also be lifted into place as a roadblock for crowd control.

— Kurt Kohlstedt

It attempts to achieve this primarily through angular surfaces (deterring sleepers and skateboarders), an absence of crevices or hiding places, and non-permeable materials (via a waterproof anti-paint coating). It is not secured to the ground and can be moved by a crane attaching to built-in anchor points. Due to its weight, it is also designed to function as a roadblock.

== History ==
Municipalities such as Camden were removing benches from public spaces because they were seen as enabling behaviour considered anti-social, including skateboarding, sleeping, loitering, and criminal behaviour such as drug dealing. Camden commissioned the design of a bench that would discourage such behaviours, and the first Camden benches were installed in 2012.

== Rationale ==
According to Factory Furniture founder Dean Harvey, the primary purpose of the bench is to influence behaviour by "minimis[ing] the amount of time people spend in an area. With a perched or sloped surface, people can't loiter for too long." One of Factory Furniture's precursor products, the Serpentine Bench, was marketed in the 1990s as being uncomfortable to sleep on.

The designers contend that "Homelessness should never be tolerated in any society and if we start designing in to accommodate homeless then we have totally failed as a society. Proximity to homelessness unfortunately makes us uncomfortable so perhaps it is good that we feel that and recognise homelessness as a problem rather than design to accommodate it."

== Criticism ==
The Camden bench received criticism as being a prime example of a wider trend of urban design that is anti-homeless, known as hostile architecture. Critics claim it is emblematic of a society where freedom in public space has been curtailed and deviance from accepted forms of behaviour has been made impossible.

Because the design is "defined far more by what it is not than what it is", the bench has been called the "perfect anti-object", a "masterpiece of unpleasant design", and "the pinnacle of hostile architecture". Other recent names have included 'defensive' or 'disciplinary' architecture. These terms describe many sculptures which are designed and attached or installed in public spaces, in an attempt to render them unusable in certain ways by certain people or groups.

As a prime example of urban design and hostile architecture, Rowland Atkinson, the co-director of the Centre for Urban Research at the University of York argues that the idea of the implication of spikes and other related architecture are a part of a broader pattern of hostility and indifference based towards social difference and poverty produced within cities. He views these implications as an assault on the poor, and an attempt to displace their distress which the general public seem to agree with. The argument begins by summarising how different processes overlap and come together, such as economic processes which result in creating people to become vulnerable.

Popular criticism focused on subverting restrictions imposed by the bench, such as by attempting to skateboard on it or sleep on it, and allowing its use only as a bench.

== Installations ==
In addition to Camden the bench has been installed at the 16th and Mission BART plaza in California. A Camden bench has been used as part of an installation artwork by Roger Hiorns. "Feature sites" for introduction of the bench were on Great Queen Street and High Holborn.

== Awards ==
The design has achieved several awards:

- Keep Britain Tidy "Best practice street cleansing" (2010)
- Design Council "Best practice for reducing crime" (2012)

It has also been accredited as:

- Home Office "PAS68 approved" (a classification for vehicle security barriers) for counter-terrorism use.

== Specifications ==
The technical specifications are:

- Length, 270 cm (110 in)
- Width, 55 cm (22 in)
- Height, 65 cm (26 in)
- Mass, approx. 1,765 kg
- Materials, exposed aggregate concrete with a galvanised steel frame
