= Simme seat =

Type of seat provided at bus stops

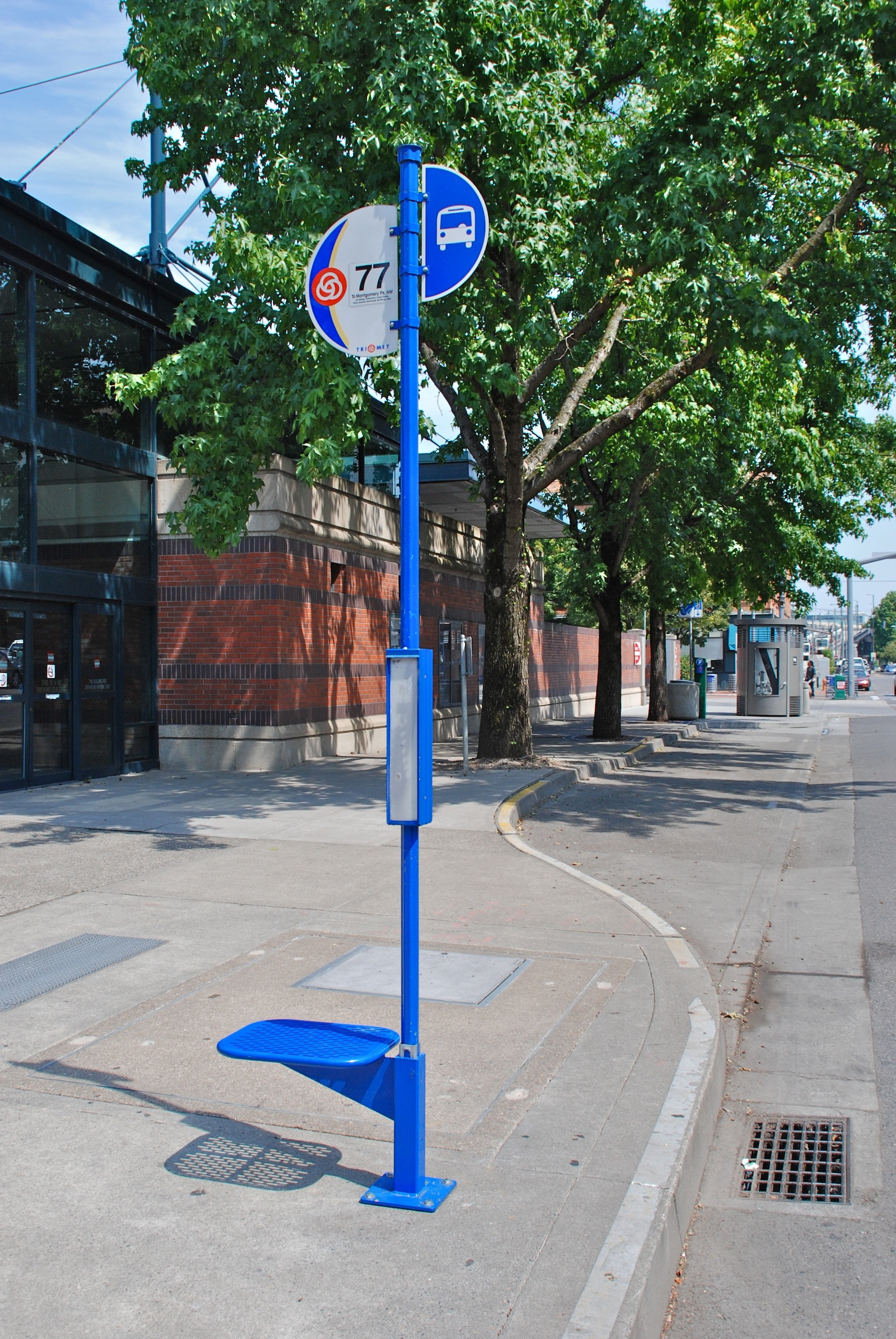
TriMet bus stop sign pole with single Simme seat attachment

A Simme seat or Simme-Seat is a type of street furniture provided at bus stops for waiting passengers.

== Description ==
Simme seats are free standing chairs that may attach directly to bus stop poles. They are utilized in areas where traditional bench seating is not desirable, such as on narrow sidewalks. This style of seat also allows passengers to be more visible to bus drivers.

Simme seats are installed in municipalities that have small transportation budgets, or in service areas that do not see enough use to warrant the construction of bus shelters. They can be installed quickly to meet increased demand.

Simme seats may also be used in places where homeless camping is prevalent as a form of exclusionary design, as they are intended to prevent people from lying down and sleeping on them.
