= Great Queen Street =

Street in London, England

Coordinates: 51°30′56″N 0°07′16″W

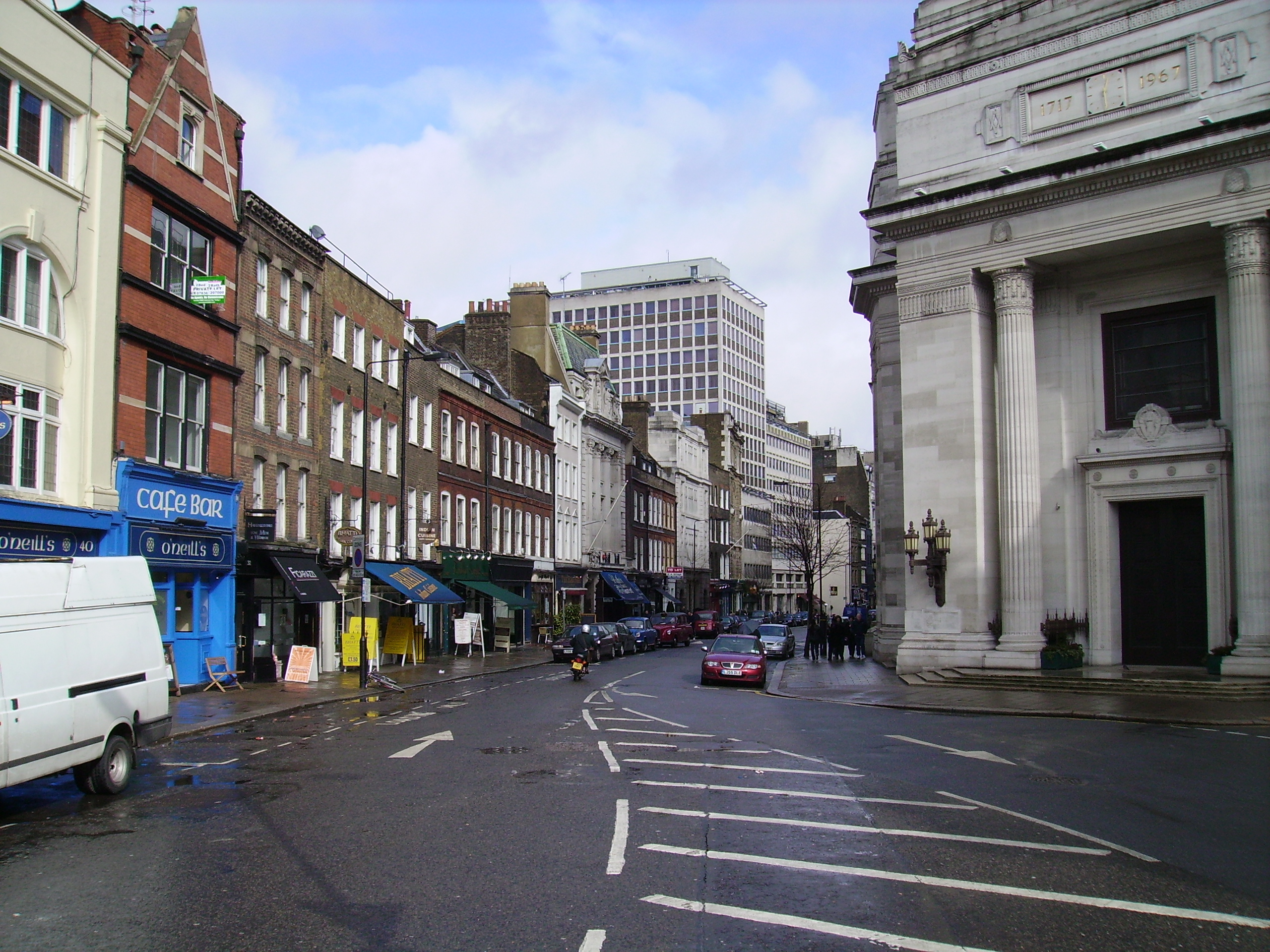
Great Queen Street, looking east. Freemasons' Hall is visible on the right.

Great Queen Street is a street in the West End of central London in England. It is a continuation of Long Acre from Drury Lane to Kingsway. It runs from 1 to 44 along the north side, east to west, and 45 to about 80 along the south side, west to east. The street straddles and connects the Covent Garden and Holborn districts and is in the London Borough of Camden. It is numbered B402.

== Early history ==
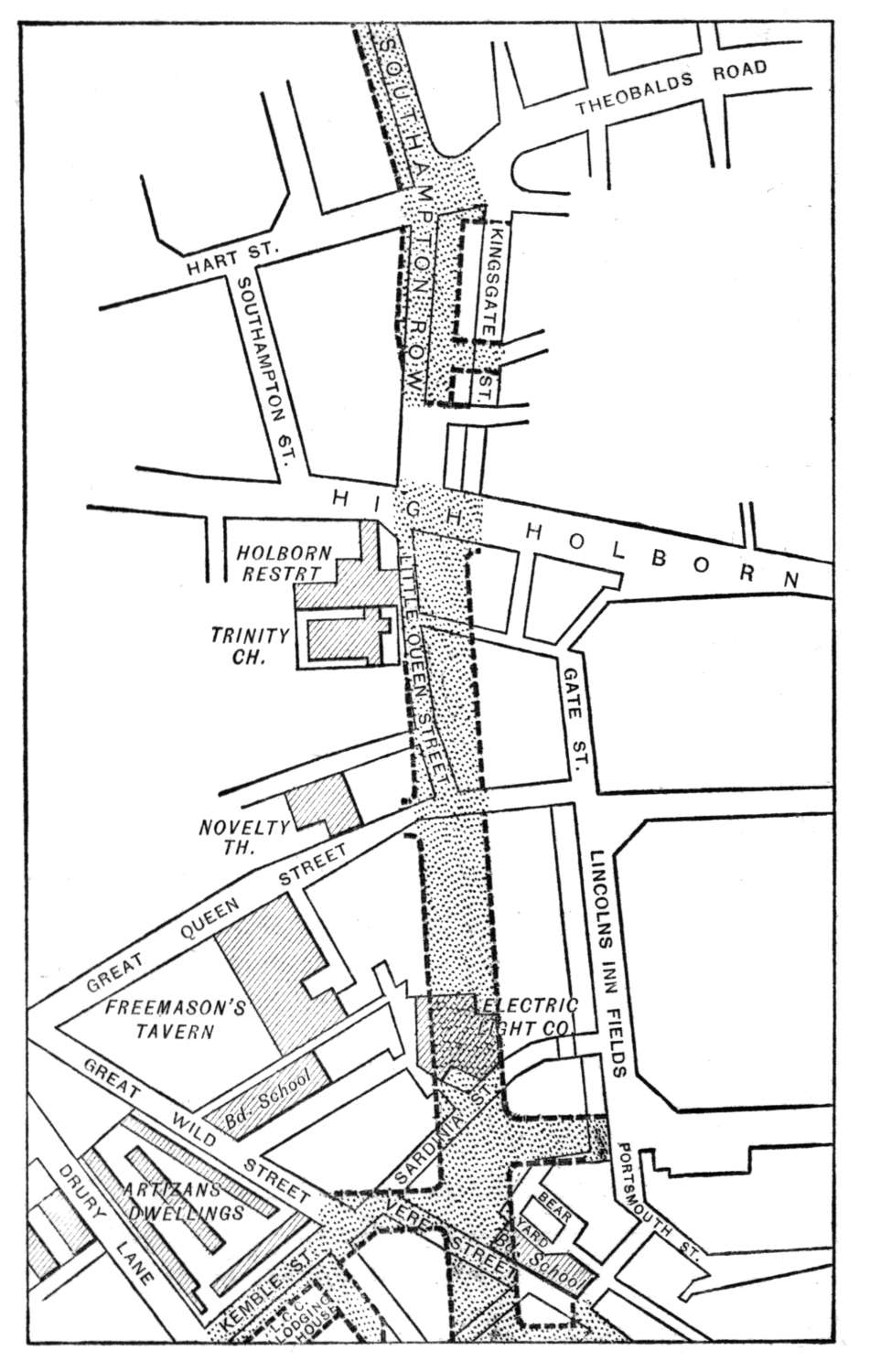
Map showing proposed route of Kingsway, c. 1900

The street was called "Queen Street" from around 1605–9, and "Great Queen Street" from around 1670 to distinguish it from Little Queen Street.

In 1646 William Newton was given permission to build fourteen large houses, each with a forty-foot frontage, on the south side of the street. Although he did not build all the houses himself, selling on some the plots, they were constructed to a uniform design, in a classical style, with Ionic pilasters rising through two storeys from the first floor to the eaves. The regular design of the houses proved influential. According to John Summerson they "laid down the canon which put an end to gabled individualism, and provided a discipline for London's streets which was to endure for two hundred years."

In 1710, the Great Queen Street Academy was founded here with Godfrey Kneller as its first governor.

A major redevelopment in the early 1900s led to the building of the broad Kingsway road, clearing away some of the maze of small streets in Holborn including part of Great Queen Street, all of Little Queen Street and the surrounding slum dwellings. Plans were published by London County Council in 1898, authorised in 1899, and the road was formally opened in 1905.

== Recent history ==
In about 2005 a local architect's practice won a competition to create a small, new square by redesigning the Great Queen Street junction with Drury Lane. The London Borough of Camden saw the potential of improving this junction as it was on their walking corridor between Leicester Square and Holborn. It was realised that to make this the best space for walking the traffic signals should be designed out as they were more of a hindrance than a help to pedestrians. Thus the Great Queen Street scheme created the trend for traffic signal removal in the UK, which together with removing guard railings and lighting columns it set a new standard for decluttering.

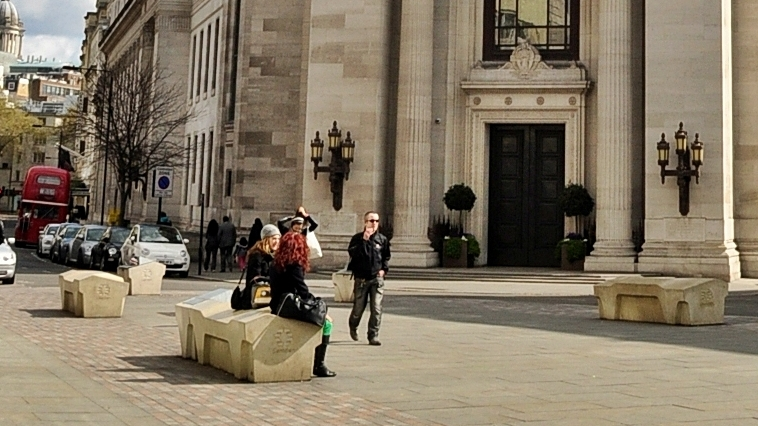
Camden benches outside Freemasons' Hall in Great Queen Street

It was also the first scheme to explain how shared space works and can be designed, and how to make it inclusive. Then to ensure that the space was more than just paving it was necessary to provide some seating. This was difficult in an area with a high crime and anti-social behaviour due to it being on the edge of the night time economy in Covent Garden and one block from a substance abuse hostel. Therefore, the project manager also wrote a brief to create the Camden bench to encourage walking and make this a social space, which subsequently won awards in designing out crime, simplifying street cleaning and inclusive design.

By removing all the street clutter from the junction it then became possible to see that when the Freemasons owned this end of Great Queen Street they faced the facades of all three building blocks in Portland stone.

== Masonic connections ==
Roughly half of the south side is occupied by Freemasons' Hall, the headquarters of the United Grand Lodge of England. The first English Grand Lodge was founded in 1717, which explains the dates on the top of the current building. Their first buildings on this site were replaced in 1860 by the architect Frederick Pepys Cockerell. However, this is the third Freemasons' Hall, which was built by international subscriptions in 1927–33 as a Masonic Peace Memorial after the Great War. It is a grade II listed building, and the only Art Deco building in London that is unaltered and still used for its original purpose. There are 29 meeting rooms and the 1,000 seat Grand Temple, which, with the Library and Museum are open to the public with hourly guided tours.

The Masonic Charitable Foundation (MCF) is also located in Freemasons' Hall. The MCF comprises four former charities: The Freemasons' Grand Charity, a grant-making charity, the Royal Masonic Benevolent Institution (RMBI), which operated 17 care homes for Freemasons and their dependents, the Royal Masonic Trust for Boys and Girls, which provided education for the children of Freemasons; and the Masonic Samaritan Fund, providing medical care and support. The MCF took over the activities of the four charities in 2016.

In 1775 the Freemasons' Tavern stood at 61–65, later the Connaught Rooms and now the Grand Connaught Rooms hotel and conference centre; like the hotel, the original Tavern was used by the public as well as Freemasons for their receptions and dinners. There are conflicting stories about the founding in 1863 of the Football Association to set down the rules of the game. The existing pub "The Freemasons Arms" on Long Acre is sometimes said to be the site of this event, but other sources say it was the Freemason's Tavern.

There is a pub called "The Prince of Wales" at 45 Great Queen Street, presumably named after the future George IV who was the Grand Master of the Freemasons in 1809.

The north side of the road is also partly occupied by Masonic regalia shops, Masonic charities and administrative offices. At numbers 19–21 is the premises of the regalia manufacturer Toye, Kenning & Spencer, which has been located at this address since acquiring the rival manufacturer George Kenning in 1956. At 23 is another shop where Masonic regalia is sold. At 30–31 is the Royal Masonic Trust for Girls and Boys, a charity that provides for the education of orphaned children of Masons.

== Residents and businesses ==
From 1882 to 1959, the Novelty Theatre (later renamed the Great Queen Street Theatre and the Kingsway Theatre) was at 8 Great Queen Street. It staged the English première of Ibsen’s A Doll’s House in June 1889.

The artist's supplies shop L. Cornelissen & Son was located at 22 Great Queen Street from 1861 to 1987.

At 31 Great Queen Street lived James Basire, a member of the Society of Antiquaries who took on William Blake as an apprentice in 1772 for seven years.

The novelist R H Barham (aka Thomas Ingoldsby) lived at No 51 between 1821 and 1824 after gaining a minor canonry at London's St. Paul's Cathedral, where he served as a cardinal.

Playwright, writer and politician Richard Brinsley Sheridan lived at No 55/56 between 1770 and 1790.

James Boswell, lawyer, diarist and author, lived at 56–58 from 1786 until 1788.

Actress, songster and star comedienne of British playhouse entertainment Kitty Clive lived at No 59 between 1743 and 1747.

Artist John Opie lived at No 63 between 1783 and 1791 and painted The Schoolmistress there in 1784.

At No 67 there was a chapel from circa 1709, taken over by the Methodists in 1789 and expanded. This venue became West London Mission in 1906 and was renamed Kingsway Hall in 1907. But then the building was condemned due to the development of Kingsway. A new Kingsway Hall was built in 1912.

Shanks and Co. ran their well-known coachbuilding business at 70–71 Great Queen Street from the 1850s, becoming F & R Shanks in 1860. The business moved out of Great Queen Street around 1905. The Shanks coachworks was located in 'New Yard'; this land was sold to the Freemasons around 1920 to build the Freemasons' Hall.

The orchestral music hire business Goodwin & Tabb was at 71 Great Queen Street from 1826 until 1906, when they moved to 34 Percy Street.

At 72 is the Kingsway Hall Hotel, built on the site of Kingsway Hall and redeveloped into a four-star hotel in 1999.

Between 1837 and 1840, the painter Richard Dadd lived in Great Queen Street while studying at the Royal Academy.

Opposite Freemason's Hall was one of the "feature sites" for the Camden bench when it was first introduced.

In October 2025, the Savage Club opened its clubhouse at 27 Great Queen Street, 168 years to the day after the club's inaugural gathering on 12 October 1857 just off Drury Lane.
