= Urine deflector =

Sanitary device

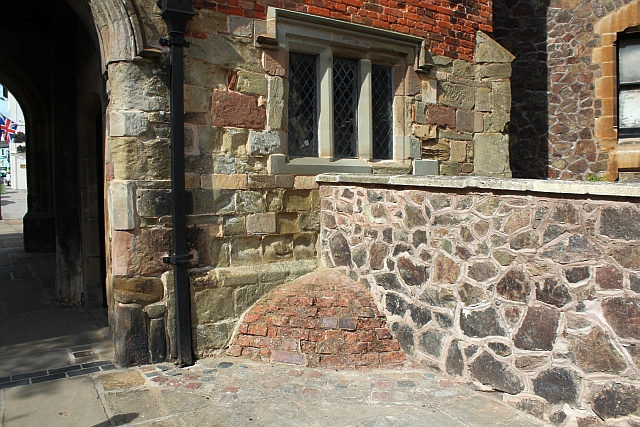
Urine deflector in a corner of the Priory Gatehouse in Great Malvern, Worcestershire

A urine deflector is a device for deflecting the stream of urine during urination. These may be part of a chamber pot, latrine or toilet intended for the purpose, or they may be deterrents, installed in the sides or corners of buildings to discourage their casual use as urinals by passers-by. They may be constructed in various ways from a variety of materials but are typically designed to have an angled surface which catches and redirects the stream.

== Intentional design ==
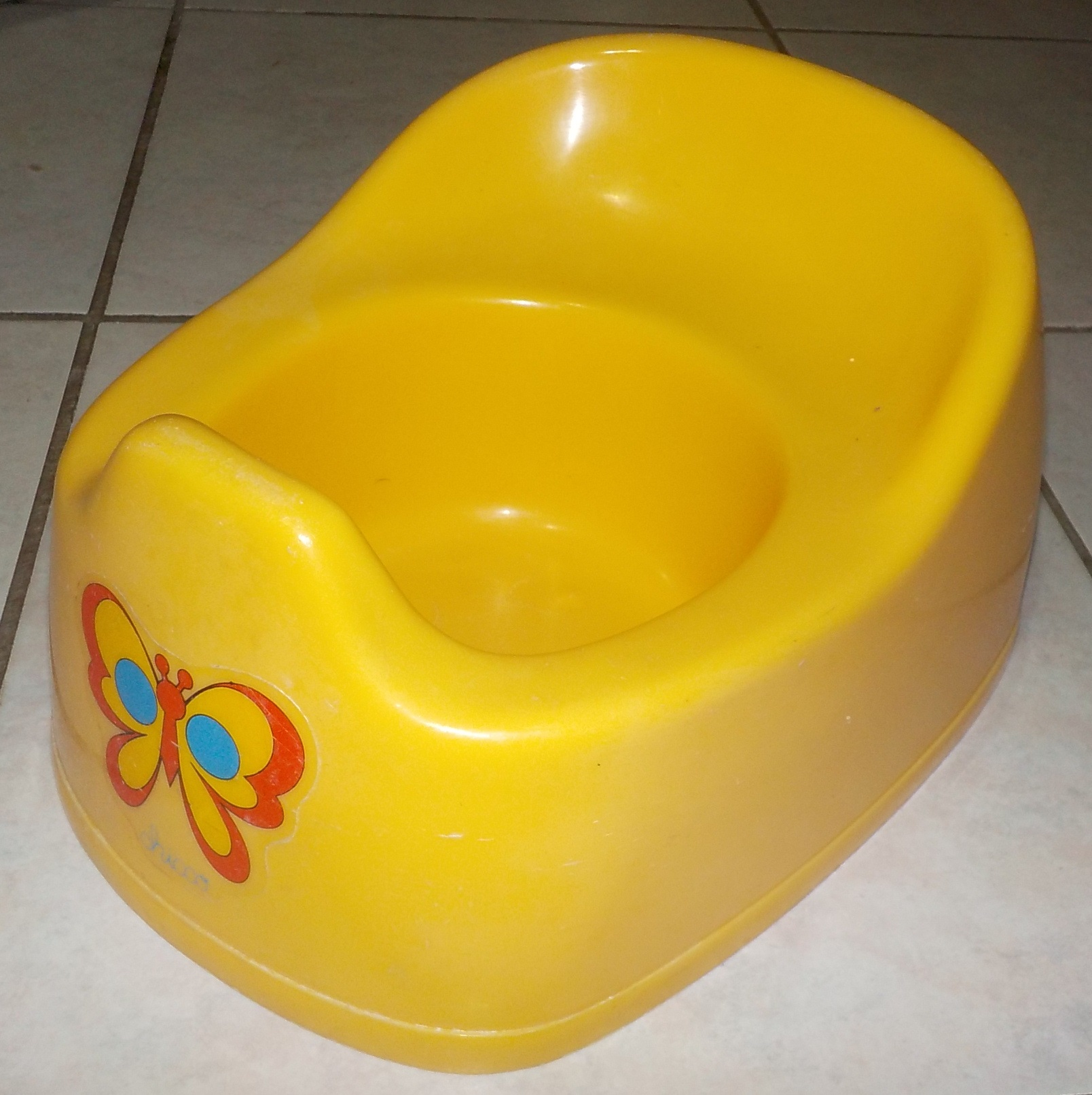
Potty with urine deflector at left

Equipment used for toilet training such as a potty chair will typically include a urine deflector to ensure that the urine does not splash forward and outside the receptacle.

Latrines constructed by the US Marines would contain urine deflectors made from sheet metal or tar paper. These would catch and direct the urine into a trough which would carry it to a separate drainage pit. This would minimise the unpleasant smell which typically results from decomposition and production of ammonia. Other designs of latrine typically include similar urine deflectors to prevent degradation of the wooden components and the walls of the pit.

== Deterrent ==
Urine deflectors are thought to be the earliest example of hostile architecture. Such devices were common in the streets of London in the 19th century. A correspondent to The Farmer's Magazine wrote in 1809,

... in London a man may sometimes walk a mile before he can meet with a suitable corner; for so unaccommodating are the owners of door-ways; passages and angles, that they seem to have exhausted invention in the ridiculous barricadoes and shelves, grooved, and one fixed above another, to conduct the stream into the shoes of the luckless wight who shall dare to profane the intrenchments.

Some may still be found in places such as the Bank of England, Fleet Street and the Savoy. Other cities where antique examples may still be seen include Lviv, Norwich and Venice. In other cities such as Vienna, barriers such as iron railings and spikes have been used to keep people away from attractive corners and crannies.

German cities such as Hamburg and Cologne have pioneered the use of hydrophobic paint on walls to deter Wildpinklers. This water-repellent coating causes the stream to rebound at a similar angle and so wet the offender. Other places such as Hackney, Manchester and San Francisco have since evaluated the method for particular trouble spots. London's Soho district was painted in this way in 2022 and Westminster council's full programme of deterrence also included posters, punishment and provision of more public toilets.

== Gallery ==
=== England ===
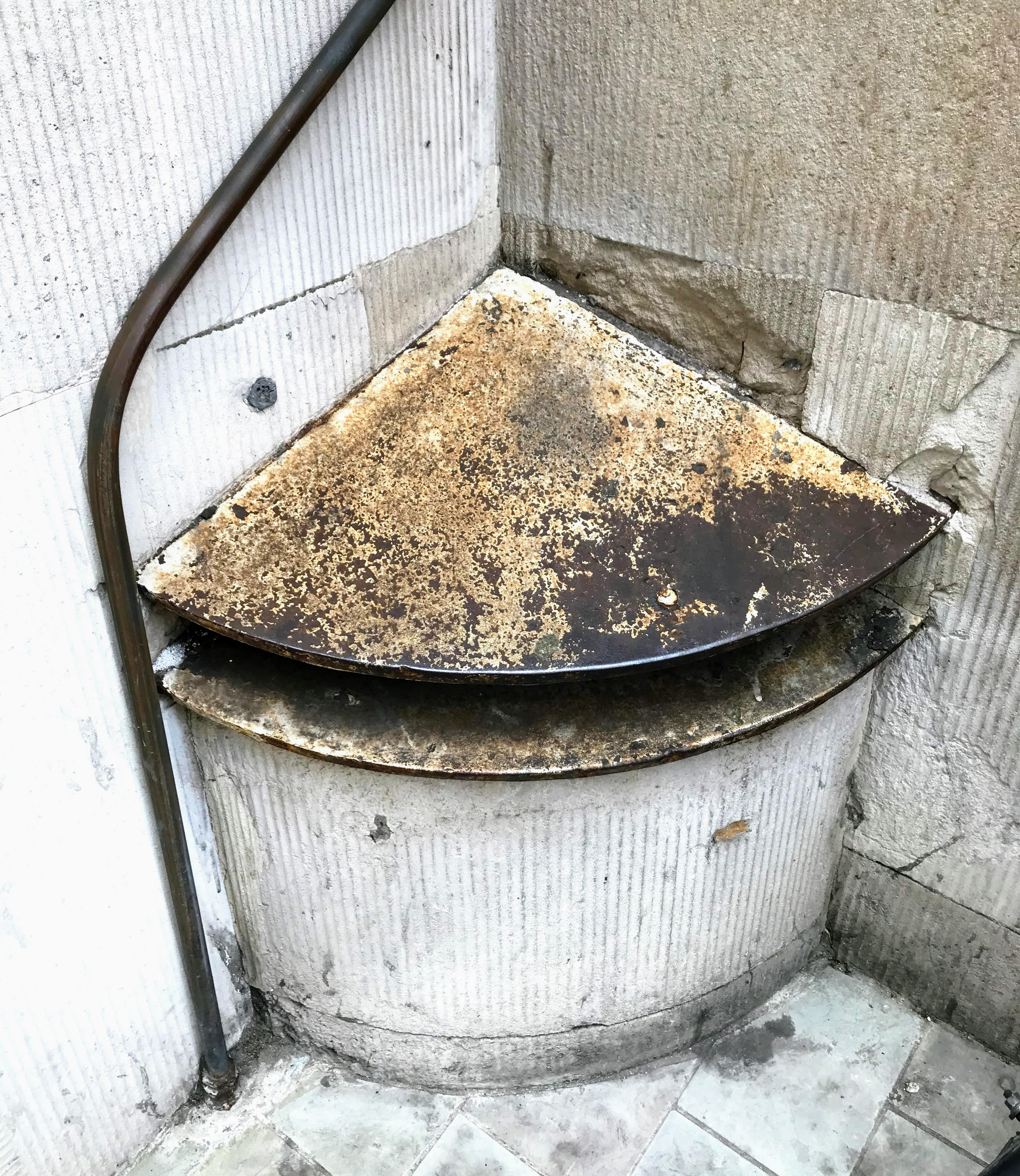
Bank of England in Lothbury

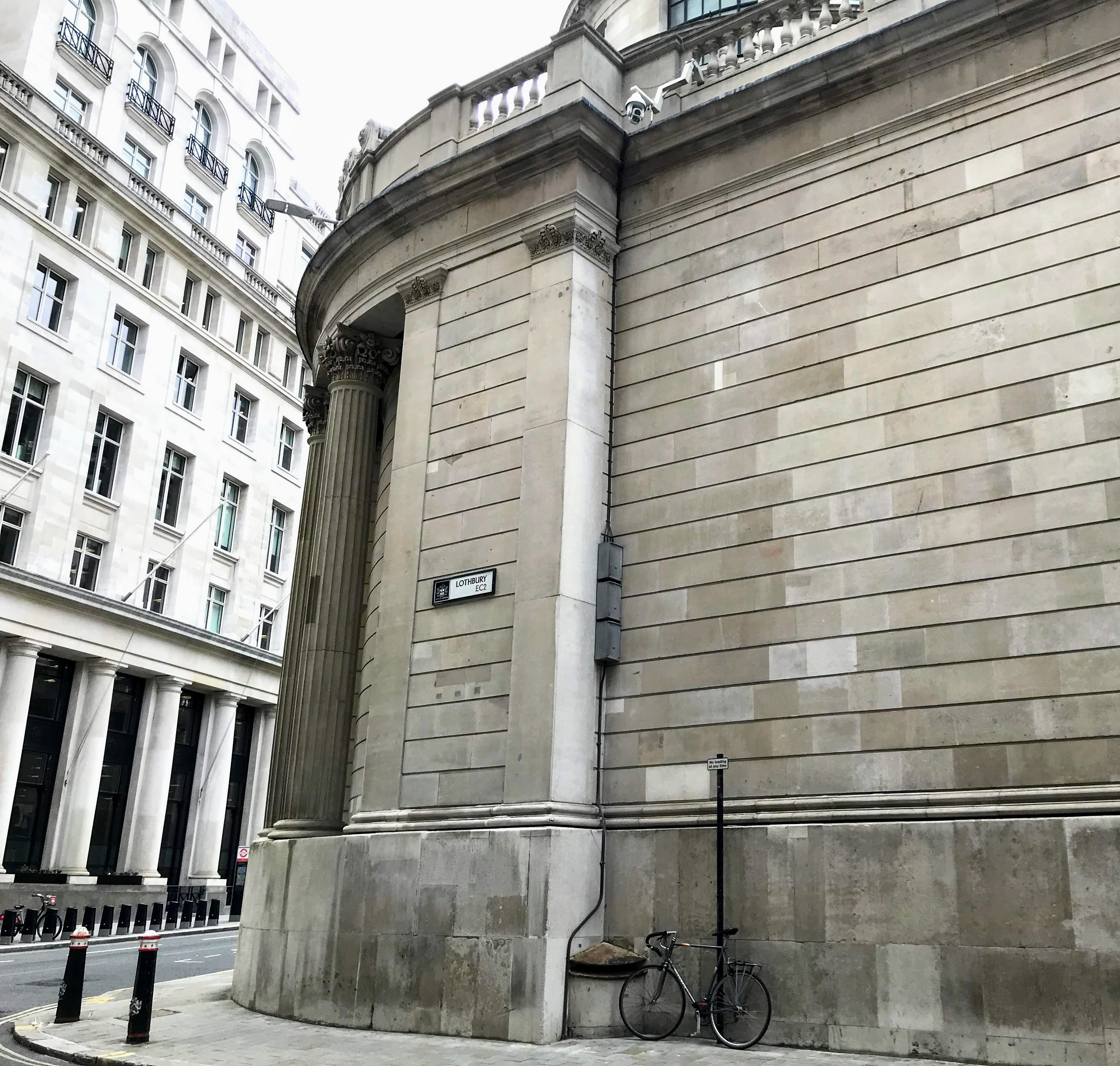
Longshot of the previous deflector showing security camera directly above

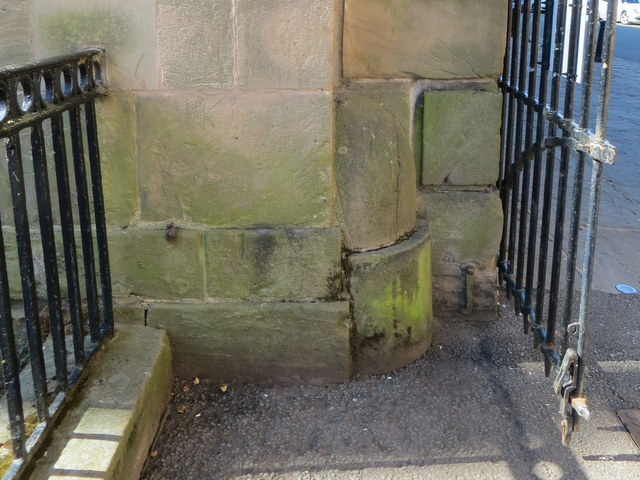
Chester Crown Court in Chester

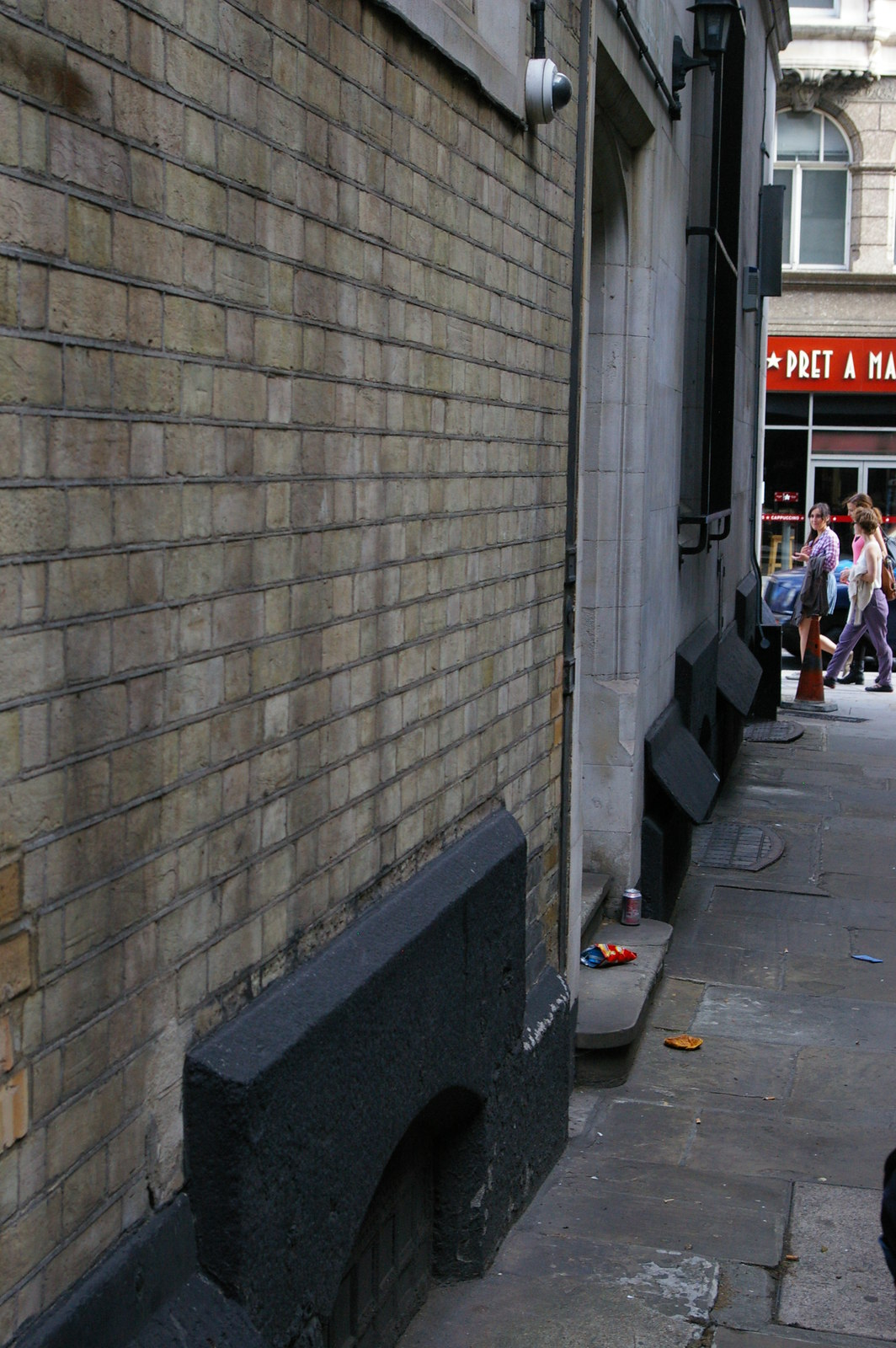
Clifford's Inn Passage, City of London

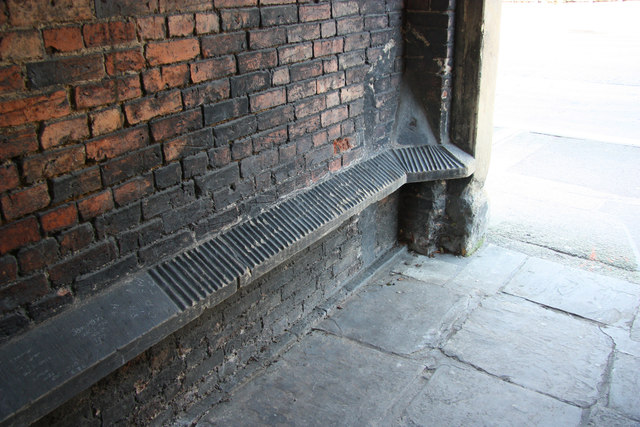
In the Coach and Horses Passage in Newark-on-Trent

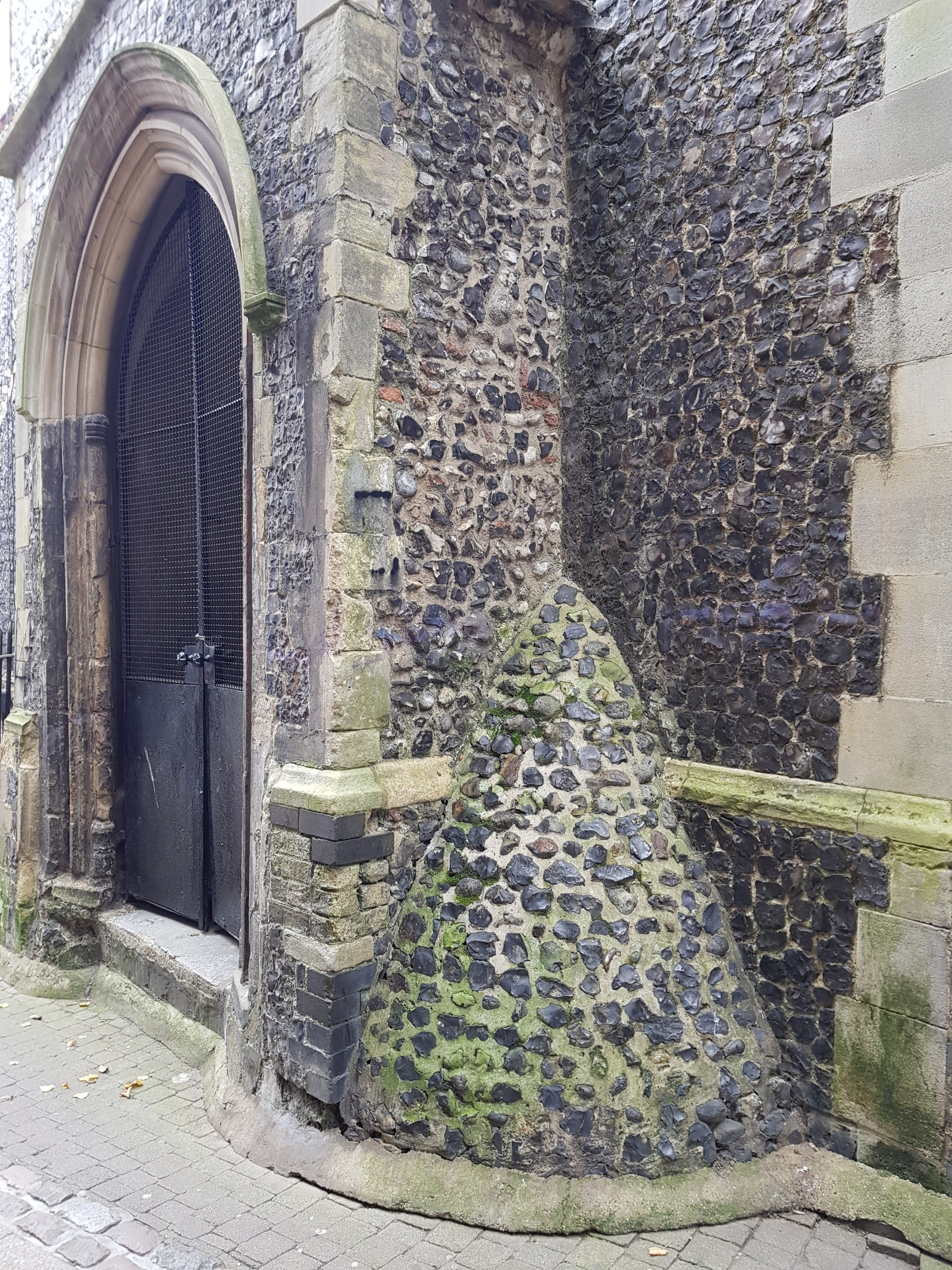
St Gregory's Church, Norwich

== See also ==
- Manneken Pis
- Taking the piss
- Urine-diverting dry toilet
