= Hostile architecture =

Civic design intended to exclude certain populations

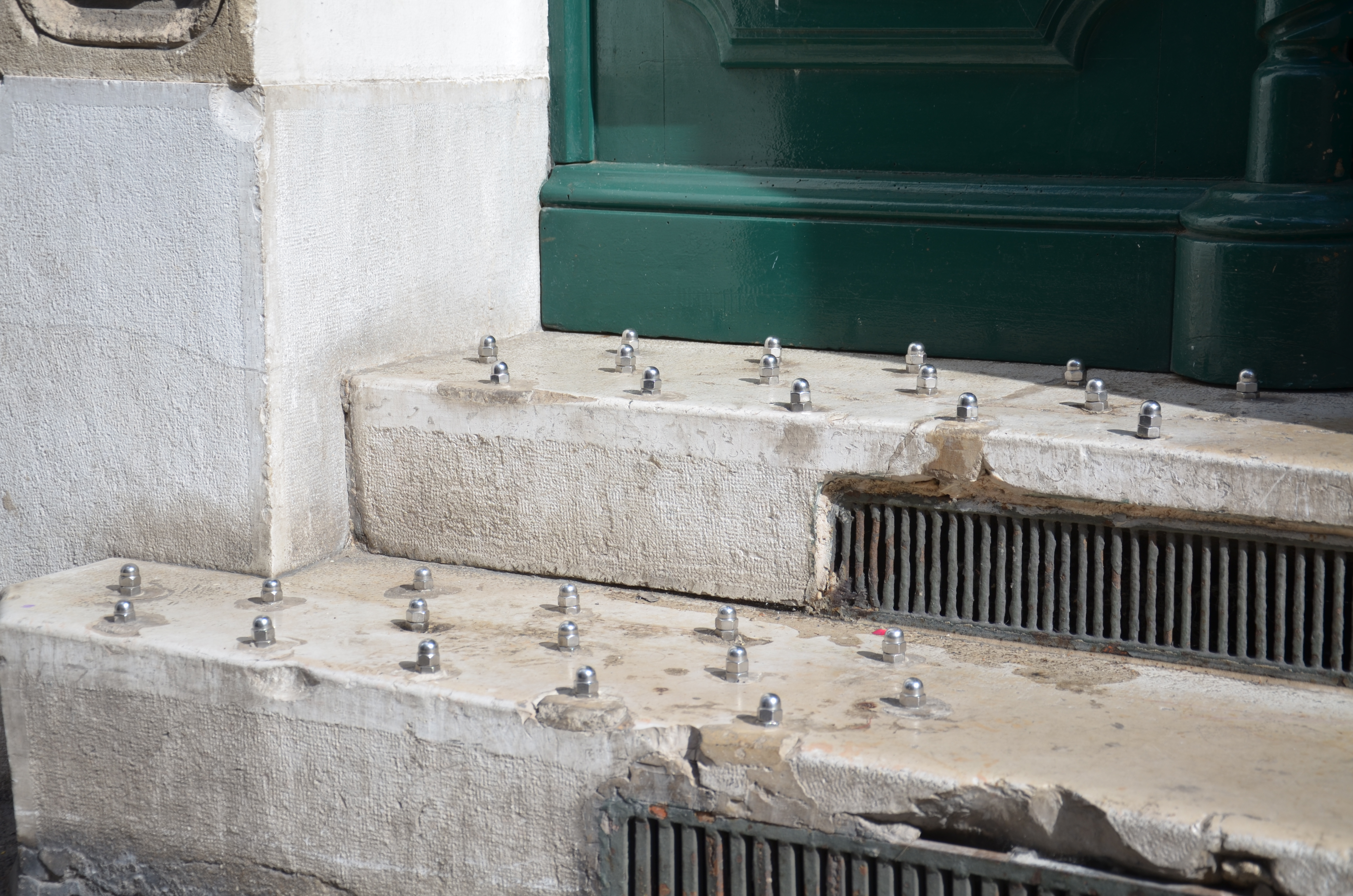
Bolts installed on the front steps of a building in Marseille, France to discourage sitting and sleeping

Hostile architecture, (Note: also known as defensive architecture, hostile design, unpleasant design, exclusionary design, anti-homeless architecture, or defensive urban design) is an urban design strategy that uses elements of the built environment to purposefully guide behavior and exclude the public from public space access. Hostile architecture is "hostile" because it covertly (and sometimes overtly) keeps people away. Hostile architecture stems from urban planning decisions that aim to fight perceived social disorder and often targets people who use or rely on public space more than others, such as youth, poor people, and homeless people, by restricting the physical behaviours they can engage in.

The term hostile architecture is often associated with items like "anti-homeless spikes" – studs embedded in flat surfaces to make sleeping on them uncomfortable and impractical. This form of architecture is most commonly found in densely populated and urban areas. Other measures include sloped window sills to stop people sitting or resting, bumps on buildings, planters and boulders on sidewalks to deter tents, benches with armrests positioned to stop people lying on them, water sprinklers that spray intermittently, and public trash bins with inconveniently small mouths to prevent the insertion of bulky wastes. Hostile architecture is also employed to deter skateboarding, BMXing, inline skating, littering, loitering, public urination, and trespassing, and as a form of pest control.

== Background ==
Although the term hostile architecture is recent, the use of civil engineering to achieve social engineering is not: antecedents include 19th-century urine deflectors and urban planning in the United States designed for segregation. One example of this was the Detroit Eight Mile wall, built in 1941, and meant to segregate white neighborhoods from black neighborhoods. American urban planner Robert Moses designed a stretch of Long Island Southern State Parkway with low stone bridges so that buses could not pass under them. This made it more difficult for people who relied on public transportation, mainly African Americans, to visit the beach that wealthier car owners could. Outside of the United States, public space design change for the purpose of social control also has historic precedent: the narrow streets of 19th century Paris, France were said to be widened to help the military quash protests.

Its modern form is derived from the design philosophy crime prevention through environmental design (CPTED), which aims to prevent crime or protect property through three strategies: natural surveillance, natural access control, and territorial enforcement. According to experts, exclusionary design is becoming increasingly common, not least in large cities such as Stockholm.

Consistent with the widespread implementation of defensible space guidelines in the 1970s, most CPTED implementations as of 2004 were based solely on the theory that proper design and effective use of the built environment could reduce crime, reduce fear of crime, and improve quality of life. Built environment implementations of CPTED seek to deter crime by manipulating the environment in which crimes occur. The six main concepts according to Moffat are territoriality, surveillance, access control, image/maintenance, activity support, and target hardening. Applying all of these strategies is key to preventing crime in any neighborhood, crime-ridden or not.

Beyond CPTED, scholarly research has also found that modern capitalist cities have a vested interest in eliminating signs of homelessness from their communal spaces, fearing that it might discourage investment from wealthier individuals. In England, much of their hostile architecture has been attributed to a desire by the government to combat an anti-social street scene, taking the form of begging and street drinking.

=== Design Apartheid ===
Design Apartheid, a term coined by architect Rob Imrie, is the assumption of sameness and able-bodiedness in a population when designing built forms. The built forms are inscribed with the ableist values of the society. An example of design apartheid can be seen in Le Corbusier's diagram of the Modulor, which utilises proportions of the body as an anthropometric aid to help architects design buildings by presenting an image of an upright male who is six feet tall, muscular, powerful, and showing no evidence of either physical or mental disability.

== Applications ==
=== Spikes ===
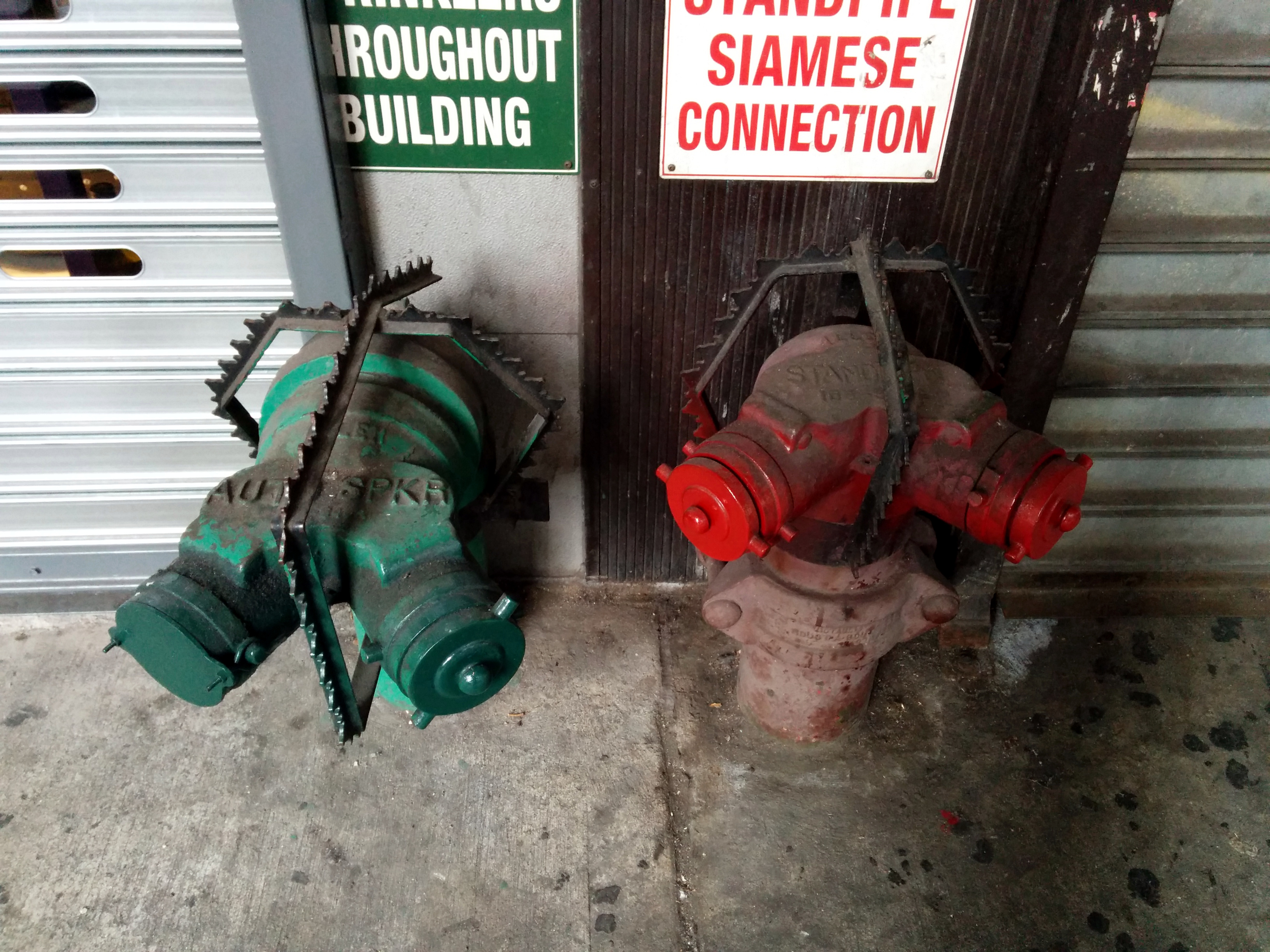
Anti-homeless spikes in New York, designed to prevent sitting.

Hostile architecture can take the form of spikes, bumps, or other pointed structures. They are typically placed on ledges outside buildings, under roofs or other places where people seek rest or shelter, and also around shops. The property management company Jernhusen uses a variant by placing pipes instead of spikes in several places at Stockholm Central Station. In 2014, images circulated on the internet of a place in London where homeless people used to sleep. The ground had been fitted with sharp, upward-pointing spikes to deter people who used to sleep there, but after widespread protests, the anti-homeless spikes were removed. Former UK Prime Minister Boris Johnson has called the spikes "stupid". There are also anti-homeless spikes which are intended to ensure that people do not, for example, sit against a house wall or stand in a particular place. It is difficult to assess how many different types exist adequately, but it is certain that there are many forms of the phenomenon, including split bricks which form cracks, various forms of bent metal pipes, and plates welded upwards to form spikes.

=== Sleeping deterrents ===
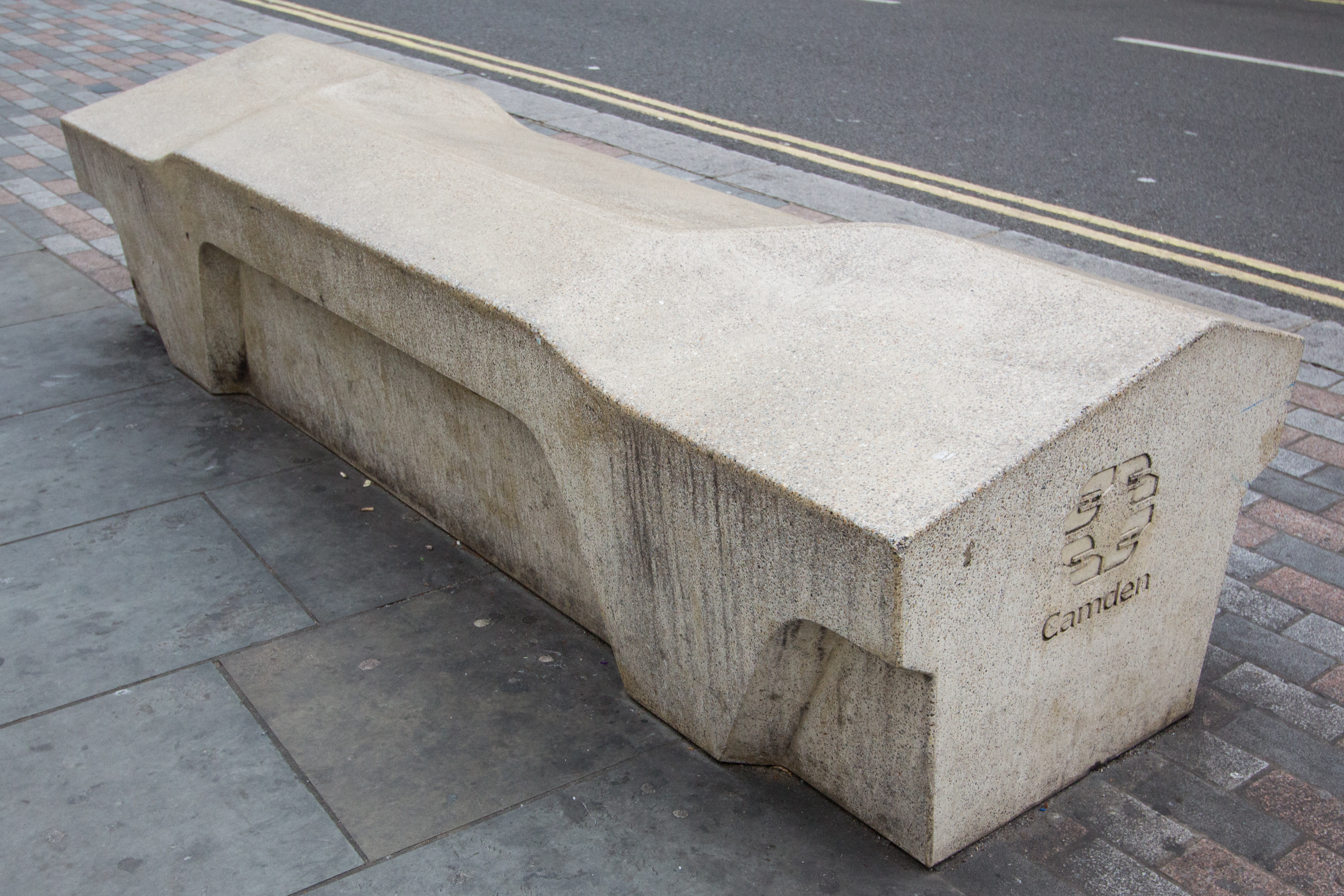
The "Camden bench", used in London, has a design that is stated to discourage sleeping, littering, skateboarding, drug dealing, graffiti and theft

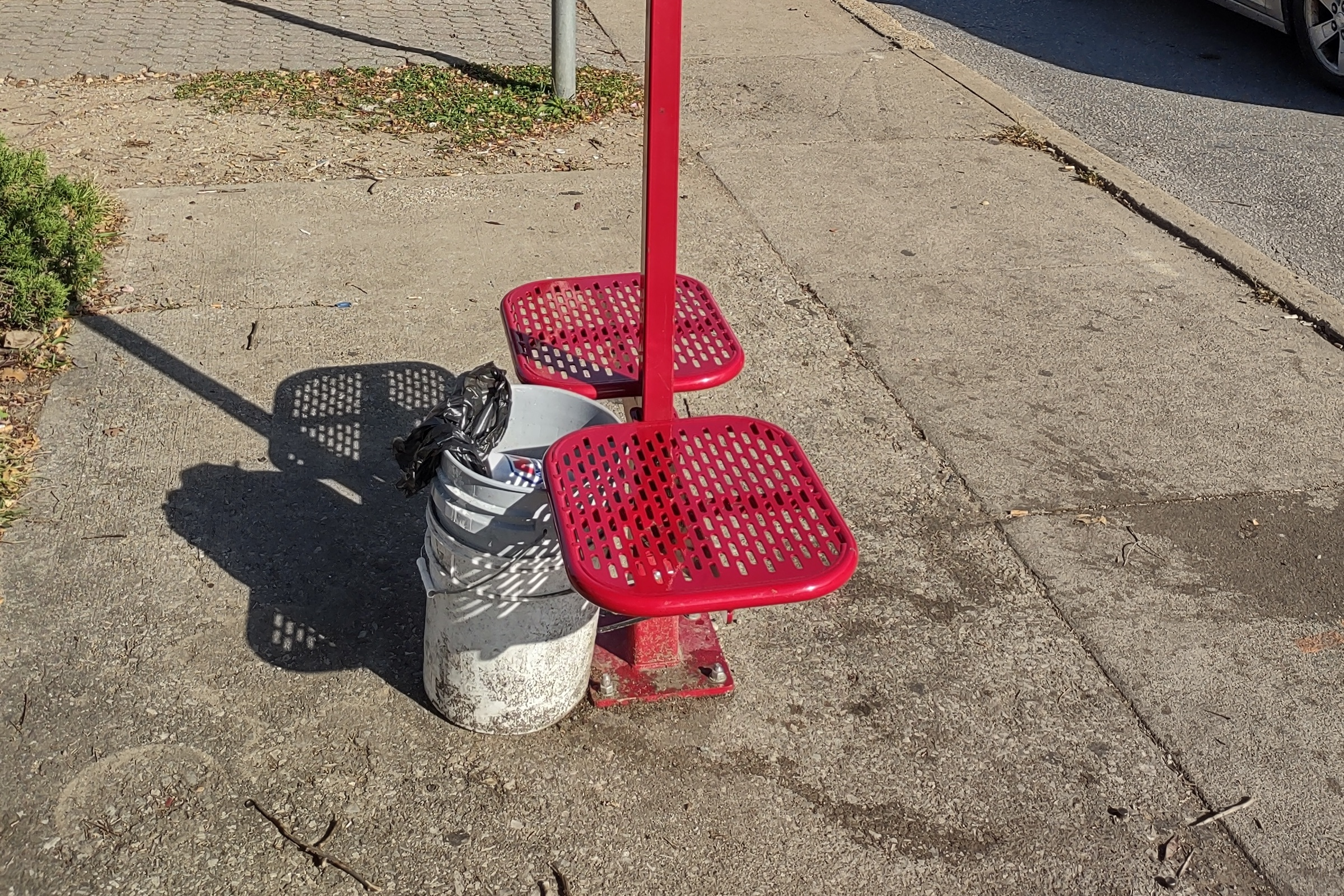
Simme seating prevents users from lying down

In many large cities, for example Tokyo and London, benches have been designed to prevent people from sleeping on them. These benches have been constructed so that the seat slopes at an angle, requiring the user to support themselves entirely with their feet; such benches are ubiquitous at bus stops across the United Kingdom. Another deterrent design is to include armrests placed down the center of the bench, preventing the user from lying down across the seats.

Camden Borough Council in London commissioned concrete-block benches (dubbed "Camden benches") designed to discourage uses such as sleeping, skateboarding, and placing stickers. There are other variants, in which level differences are absent but they tend to be either too short to lie on, or have iron pipes placed two-thirds of the way in, or multiple armrests placed along the entire length of the bench. Such benches are common in airports.

Other types of seats, such as Simme seats, are designed to be too small to accommodate lying down or sleeping. They are installed in locations where homeless camping is prevalent.

When the City Tunnel in Malmö, Sweden, was opened in 2010, the design of the benches on the new train platforms was reported to the Equality Ombudsman because the benches were tilted so much that they were difficult to impossible to use for sitting. The Swedish state-owned real estate company Jernhusen has also used so-called "homeless-proof" benches at the train station in Luleå, with seven iron bars at 47 cm (19 in) intervals per bench. Jernhusen's press officer maintained that they "put in the armrests primarily to make it easier for the elderly and disabled to sit and stand up" but admitted in an interview that the perceived orderliness problems at the station building influenced how the benches were designed. Another example of a company that has installed such benches is Berliner Verkehrsbetriebe, Berlin's local public transport company.

Some examples of sleeping deterrents involve temporary changes to buildings. An example of this occurred in a Liverpool building, previously the Bank of England headquarters, in December 2016. A blue, sloping steel structure covered in oil was placed over the stairs at night, so that the homeless who used to sleep and rest there would not stay.

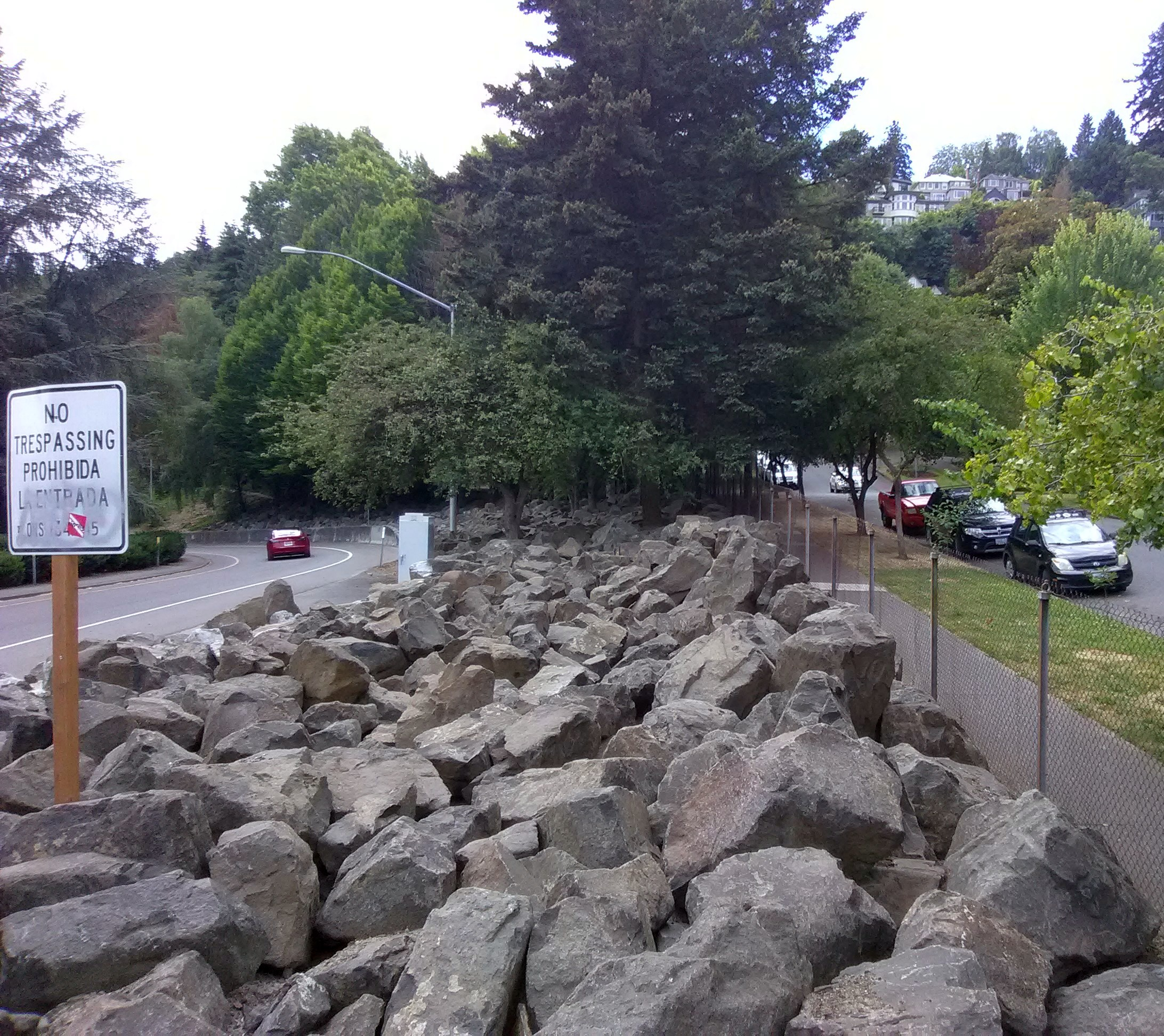
Boulders installed along a freeway ramp in Portland, Oregon to deter transient camps

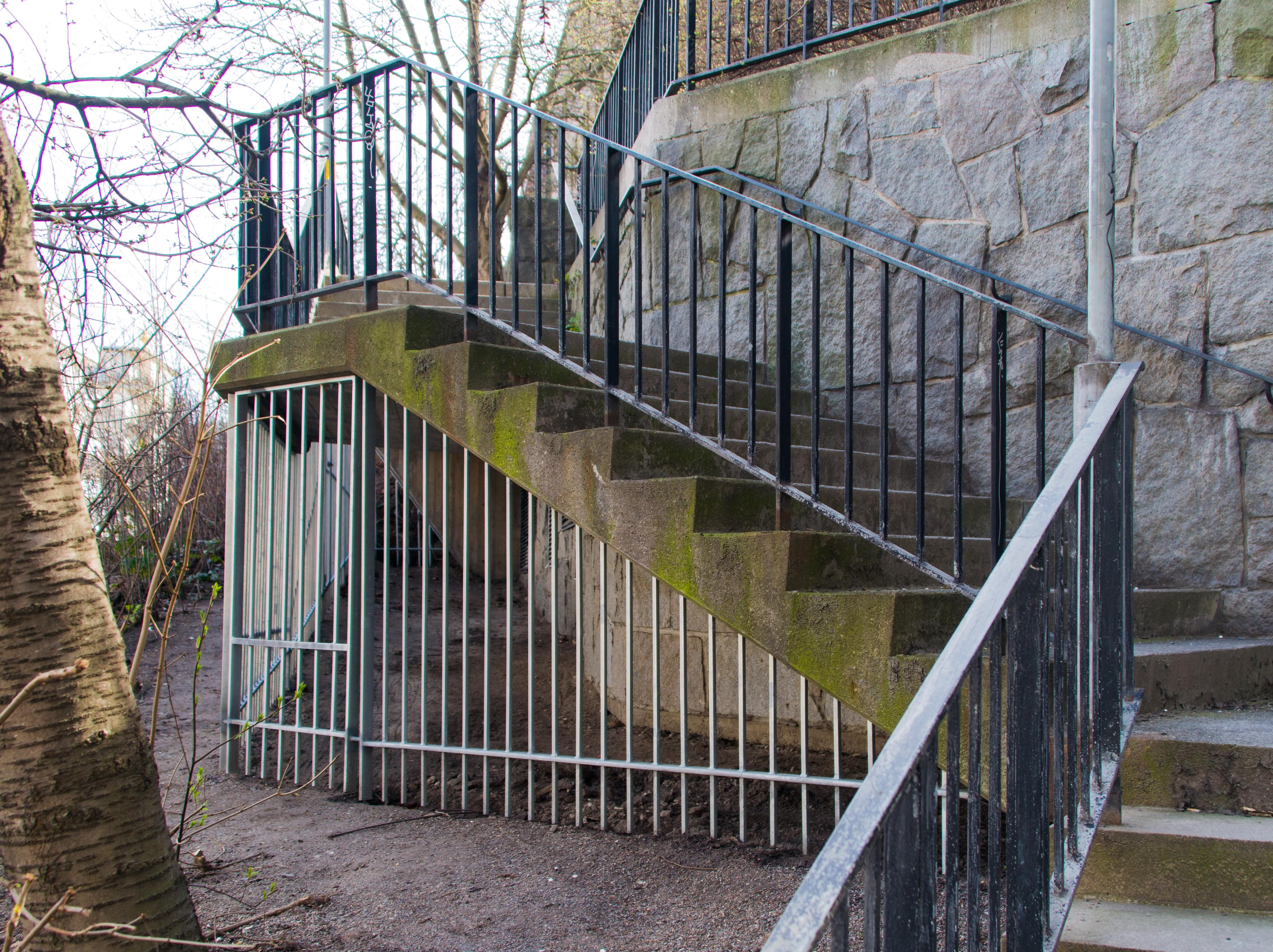
Fence under the stairs of the City Archives in Kungsholmen in Stockholm (2015)

=== Camping deterrents ===
In Seattle, Washington, United States, the city government installed bicycle racks to prevent homeless people from camping.

Since 2013, the Oregon Department of Transportation in Oregon, United States, has deployed large boulders at eight locations that had been the sites of transient camps in Portland. These boulders were installed to deter illegal camping near the freeways.

=== Fences or grates ===
Fences or grates are a common form of exclusionary design, often used to prevent access to places where there is protection from the elements, for example under stairs, bridges, or near fan systems that blow out hot air.

In the spring of 2015, the City of Stockholm, Sweden, erected a 200,000 kr (~22,900 USD) fence to prevent homeless people from seeking shelter under a staircase in Kungsholmen.

=== Removal ===
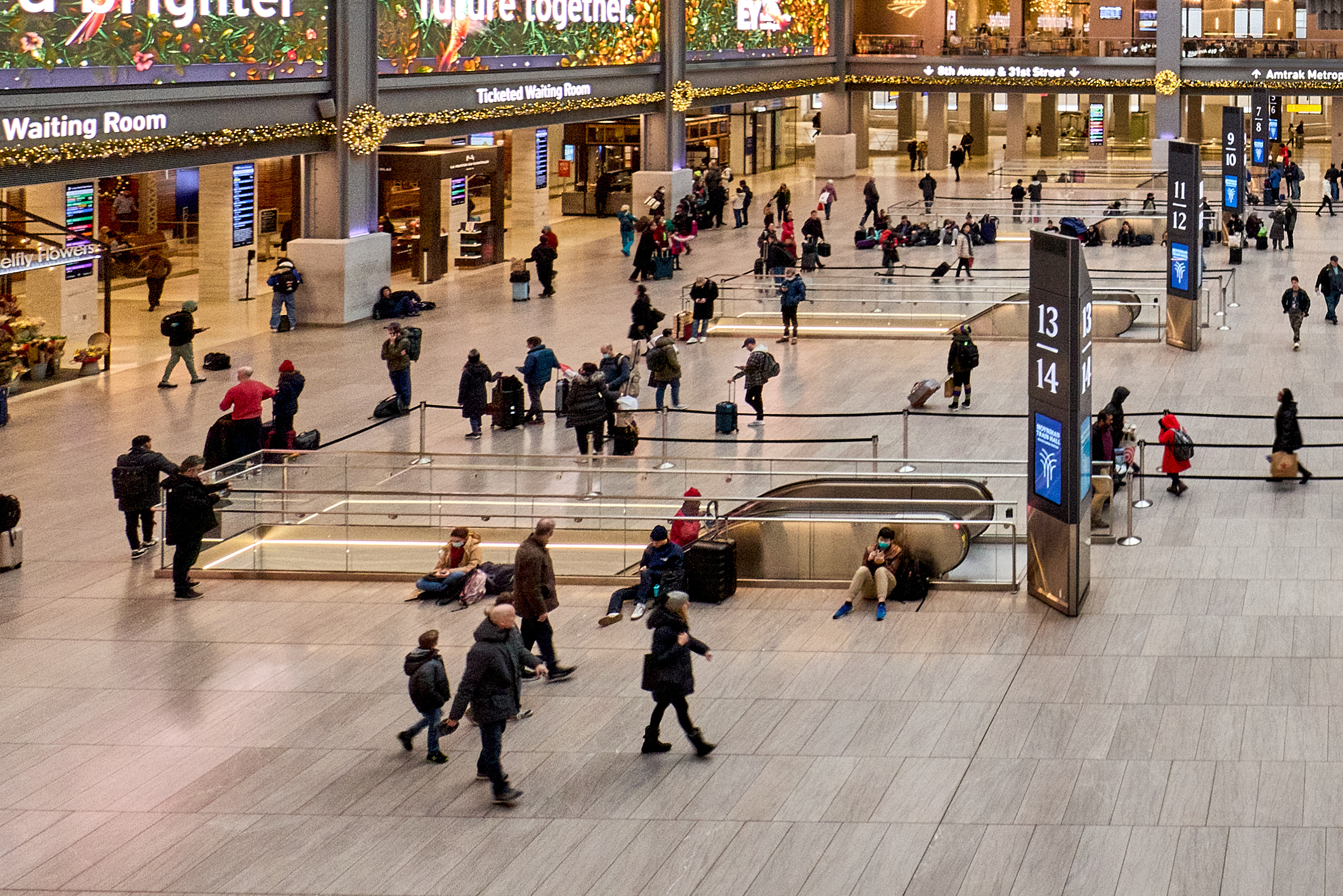
Passengers sit on the floor waiting for trains in the Moynihan Train Hall in New York City due to a lack of benches, which some critics have argued is designed to keep away the homeless.

Sometimes exclusionary design is not about adding features, but rather about taking them away. Fredrik Edin, who has written a book on exclusionary design, says that removal is the most common form of exclusionary design, in which, for example, benches used by the public are removed precisely because the public uses them. One example is when representatives of the New York City Subway announced via social media in 2021 that "benches were removed from stations to prevent the homeless from sleeping on them." The agency later said the tweet was a mistake. Benches at certain locations at Stockholm Central Station were removed in 2015 in favour of chairs, and benches were also removed at Luleå railway station. Their press officer stated that they had problems with the station being used as a warming shelter. Many public toilets have begun to be removed in the UK in places considered to be untidy.

=== Security cameras ===
One of the most common forms of hostile architecture is surveillance. While security cameras do not physically prevent people from engaging in certain behaviors, they can restrict such behaviors in public spaces by enabling remote oversight and increasing the fear of retaliation for socially taboo actions. In cities like Cincinnati, there has been a noted sharp increase in the number of CCTV cameras in public spaces since the 1990s.

=== Urination deterrent ===
A urine deflector is a device for deflecting the stream of urine during urination. These may be deterrents installed in the sides or corners of buildings to discourage their casual use as urinals by passers-by. They may be constructed in various ways from a variety of materials but are typically designed to have an angled surface which catches and redirects the stream.

=== Art, planter beds and flower pots ===
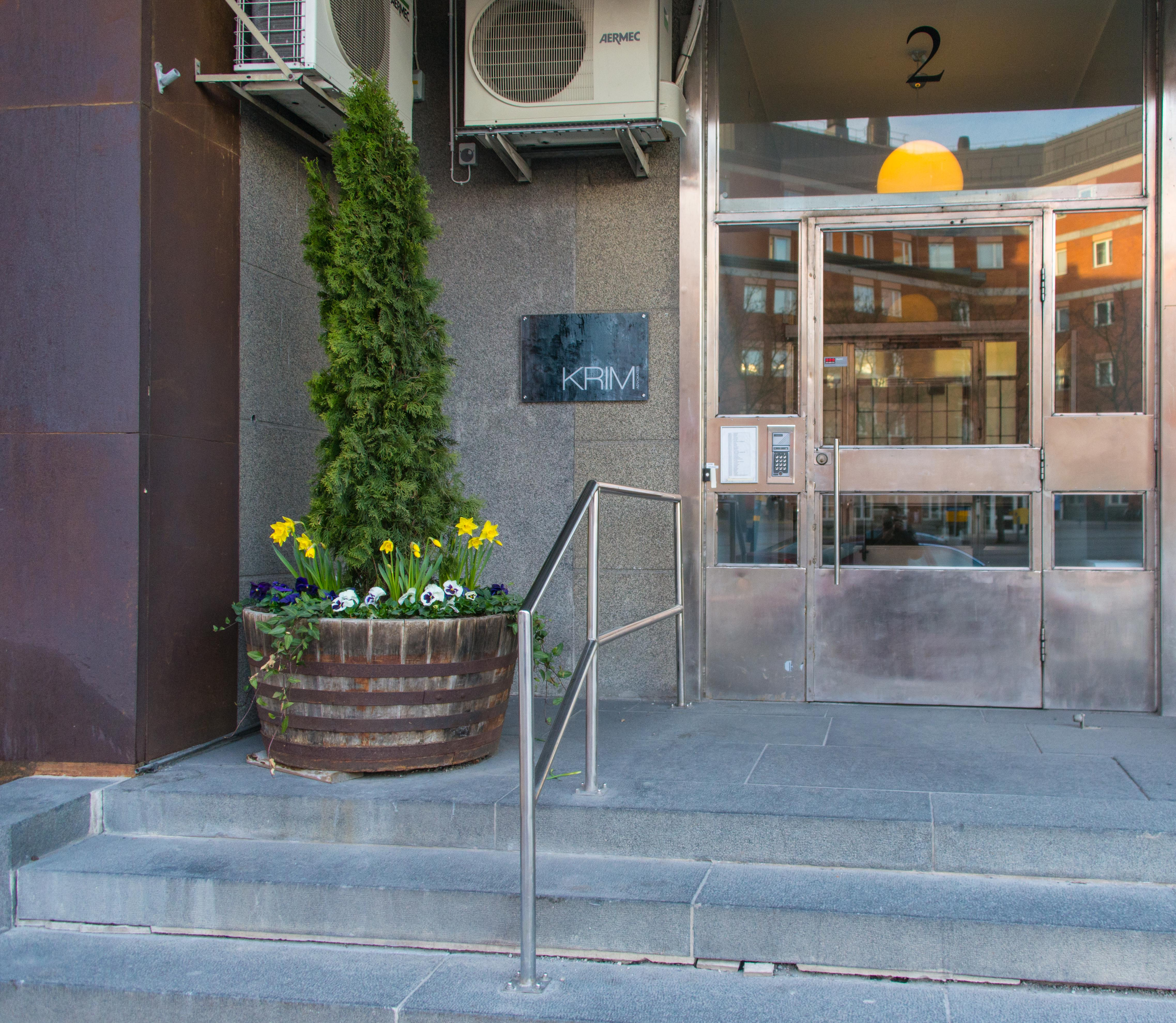
A large, sturdy flowerpot outside a building in Stockholm, designed to discourage use of the space, without looking aggressive

This type of exclusionary design may involve, for example, installing a large flowerpot where homeless people previously slept on the pavement. Other examples that have occurred include a stone painted in rainbow colours, removing blocking shrubbery from a sidewalk, and "fun"-shaped seating.

In 2023, businesses, homeowners and the public works department in San Francisco began using steel tubs as garden beds to deter camping and sleeping rough. Some residents have objected to the deployment of planters, citing a continued lack of funding for overcrowded shelters; to the haphazard placement of planters; and removal of sidewalk space. Residents with mobility issues raised concerned about reducing the accessibility of sidewalks. The city instituted a free permitting system for street planters in response.

=== Loudspeakers ===
In Sweden, loudspeakers in Finspång have played music to get people with a substance use disorder to leave certain places. In the USA, UK and Germany, so-called anti-loitering devices (e.g., The Mosquito) have been installed to prevent young or homeless people from lingering in areas where they are installed. The devices work by emitting a monotone sound at such a high frequency that most people after adolescence lose the ability to hear it. Critics have stated that the devices constitute a violation of human rights and also comment that the phenomenon would create a "dangerous gap" between young people exposed to it and older people who can avoid it. In Germany, classical music has been used in an attempt to keep drug users away. In Berlin, a plan to use atonal music at S-Bahn stations was withdrawn after criticism.

=== Sprinklers ===
Sprinklers are used in areas where spikes are considered too permanent; this solution involves spraying water on those who are in a particular place at a particular time.

In the Skid Row neighborhood of Los Angeles, sprinklers were turned on at night to deter encampments in parks.

The Strand Bookstore in New York used such a system in 2013 to deter homeless people from sleeping outside the store at night. Bonhams in San Francisco was criticised for an external sprinkler system that it claimed was used to clean "building and perimeter sidewalks during non-business hours intermittently over a 48-hour period", and which was also a point where homeless people gathered.

=== Sex in robotaxis ===
"Love in Traffic", an academic and industry workshop, was held in Sweden in September 2026. Subtitled "Physical and Digital Design Against Consensual Sexual Activity Inside Public and Shared Automated Vehicles", it studied methods of dissuading "content creators" from filming themselves having sex in robotaxis.

== Reception ==
Opposition to hostile architecture in urban design states that such architecture makes public spaces hostile to all people and especially targets the transient and homeless populations. Proponents say that clearly establishing a sense of ownership over the space helps maintain order and safety and deter crime and unwanted behaviors.

Examples of hostile architecture circulating within UK media have led to negative reception. Nonetheless, types of hostile architecture have increased. For example, Selfridges in Manchester installed metal spikes outside their store for the purpose of reducing "litter and smoking," which suggests hostile architecture may be implicated for one reason but explained by another.

Often as part of a larger pattern of tactical urbanism, some opponents of hostile architecture have responded to it directly to undermine its intended effects. Where public seating is absent or inadequate, some have built and installed seating themselves in an act called "chair bombing". Others have removed or vandalized anti-homeless spikes and armrests in protest of anti-homelessness legislation. Some members of England's homeless community interviewed by researchers have noted that hostile design contributes to their displacement and feelings of insignificance, as it appears that local business interests are prioritized over their survival.

=== Identification ===
Some forms of hostile architecture are easy to identify, while others could be interpreted as either exclusionary or non-exclusionary, such as spaced-out singular chairs constructed at a playground in Sweden, which may appear intentionally designed to dissuade homeless sleeping, or as an acknowledgement that Swedes consider it impolite to sit near strangers. Some researchers have said that hostile architecture should be evaluated within the wider context of the community, and should recognize the social and political forces motivating a particular design choice, such as anti-homelessness legislation or sentiments.

== Evidence ==
As of March 2020, no wide-scale empirical study has been conducted to measure the impact of hostile architecture on the wellbeing of homeless people or other targeted populations.

== Gallery ==
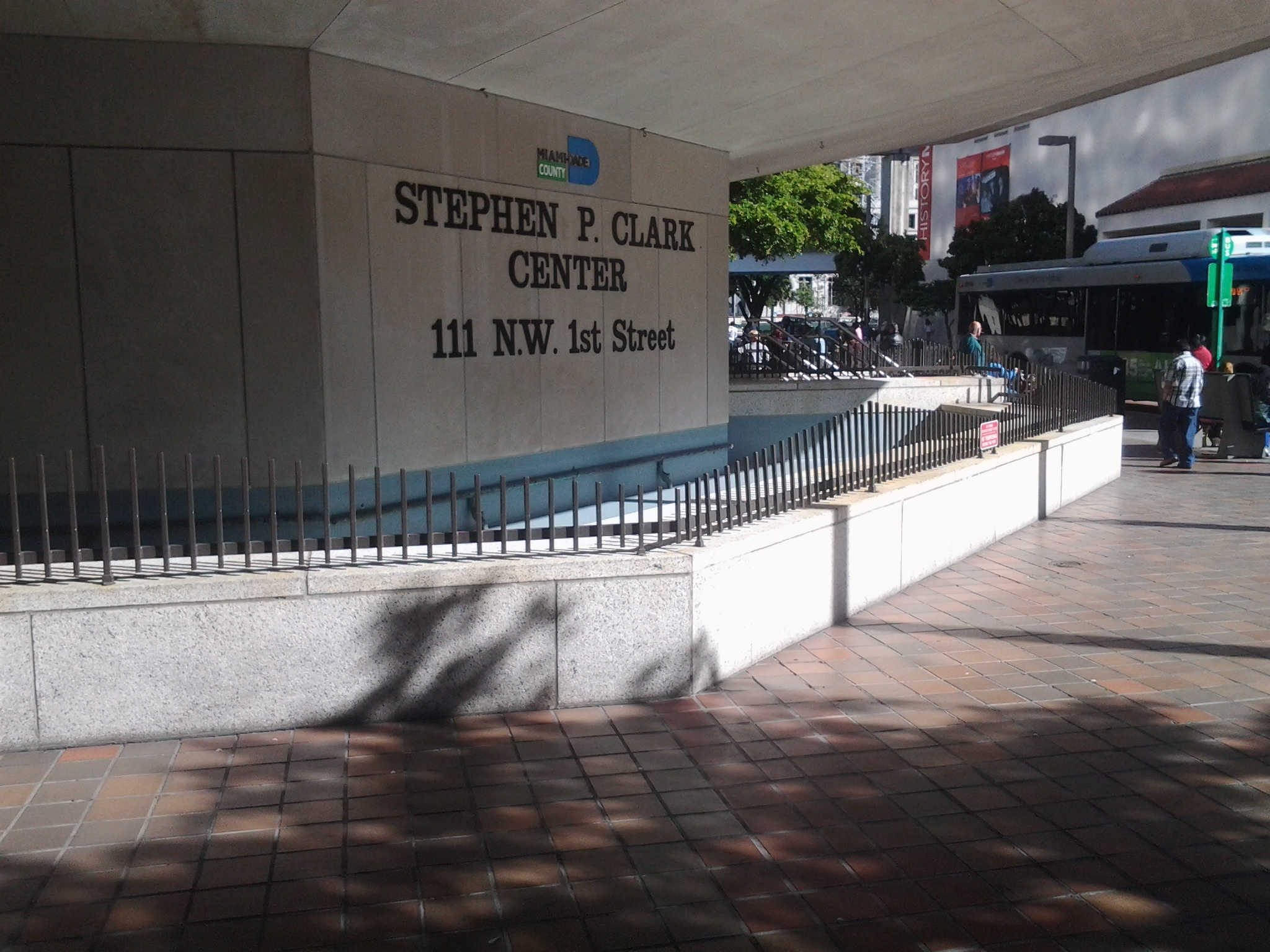
Spikes added around fountain in Government Center, Miami, in 2011 at downtown transit center

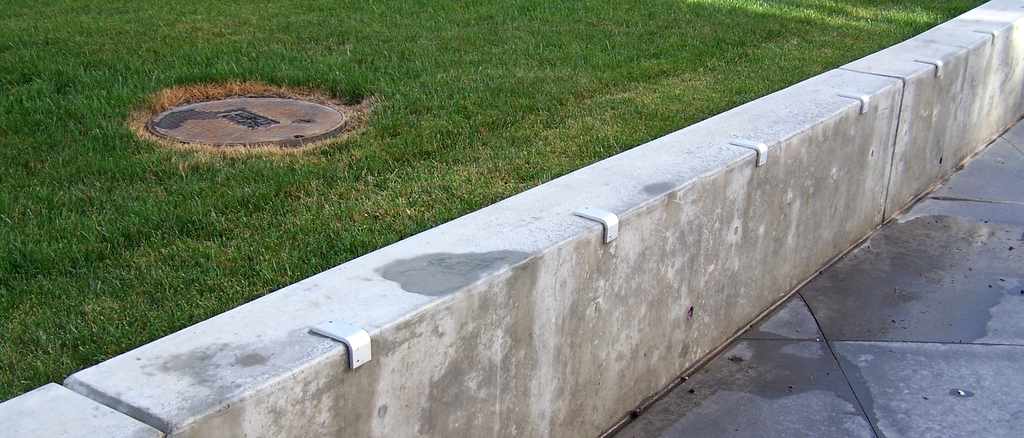
Ledge with skatestoppers preventing skateboarders from grinding

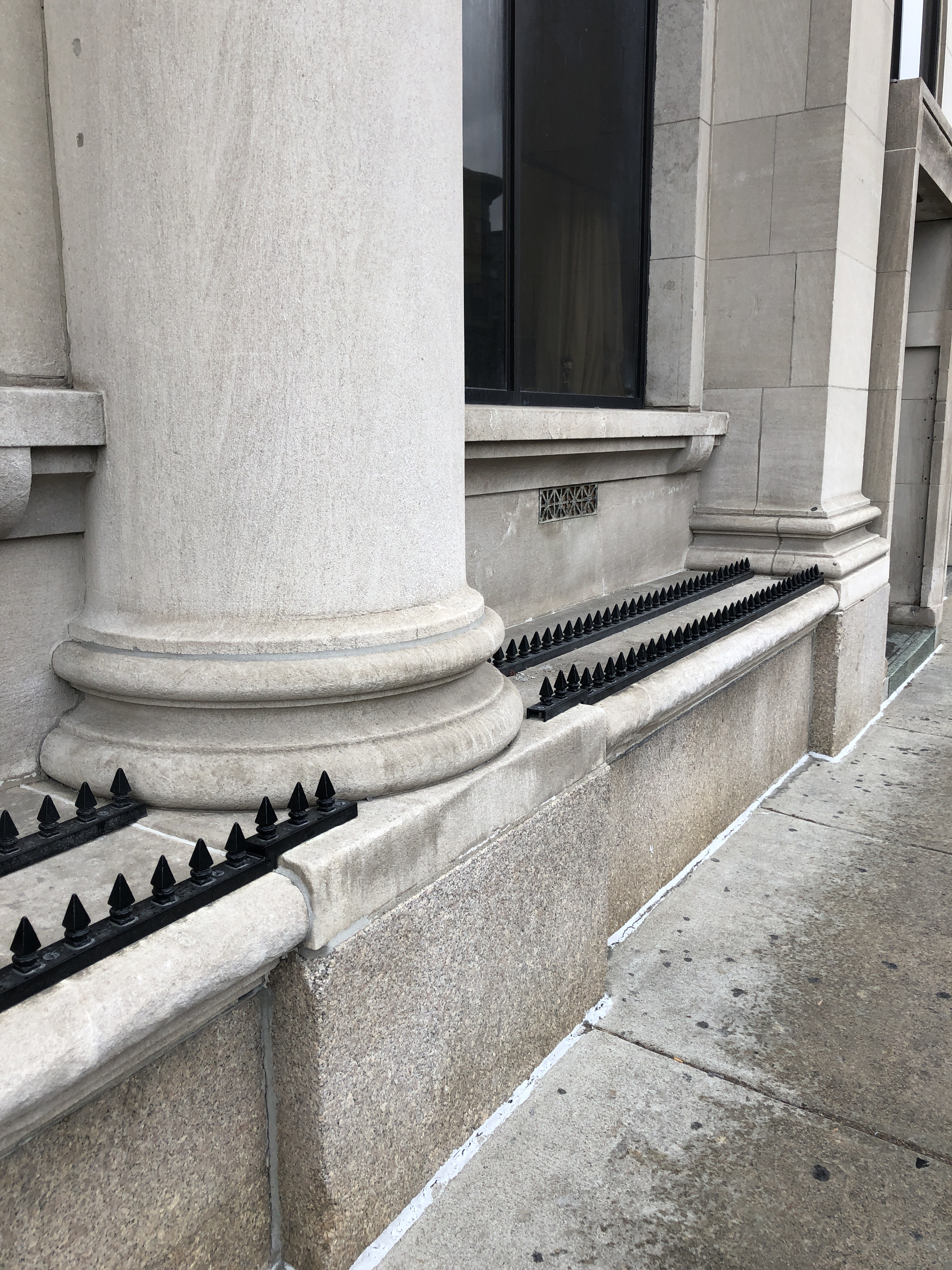
Spikes on a ledge in Boston to prevent sleeping or sitting

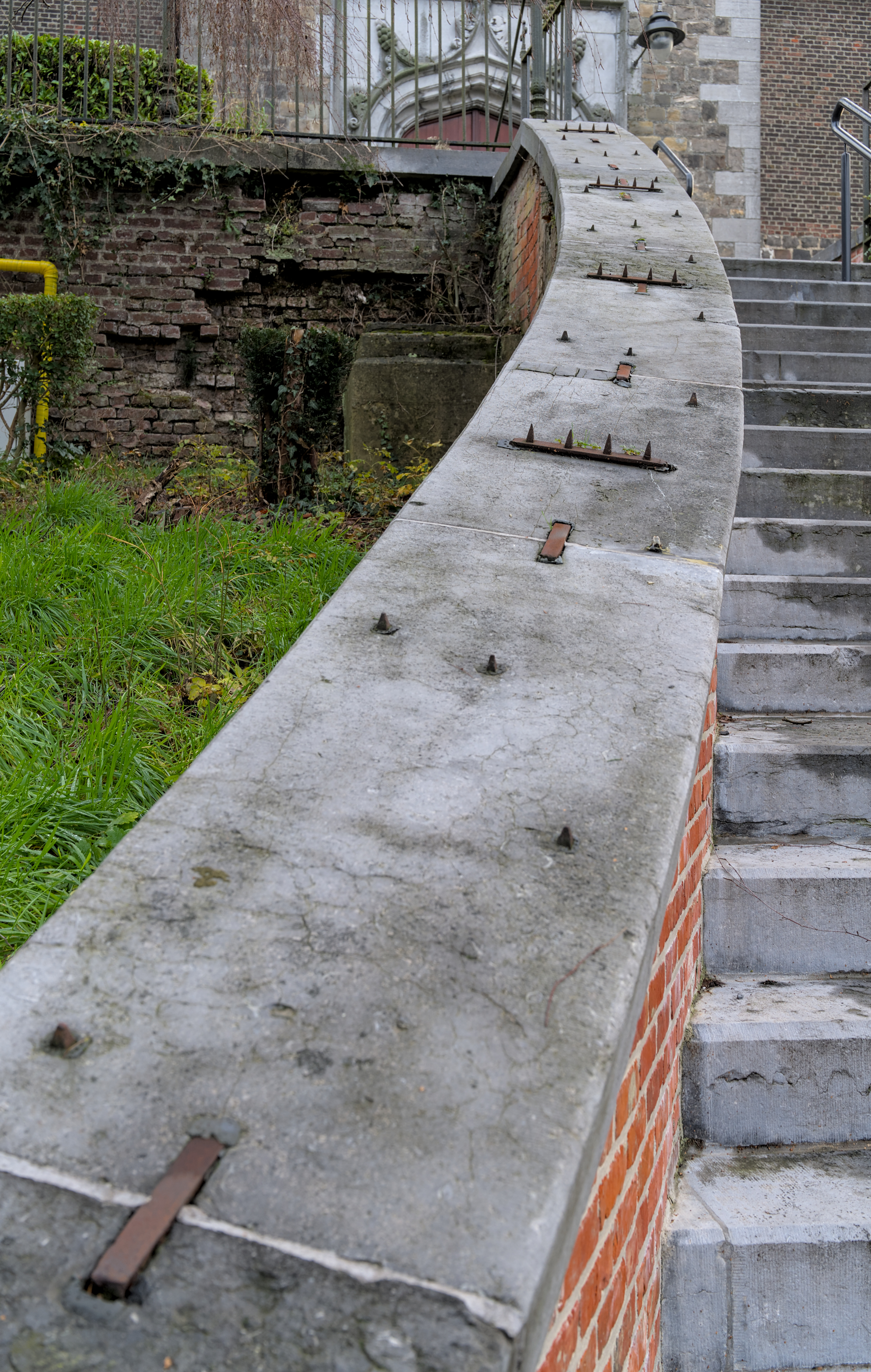
Spiked handrail, presumably preventing users from sliding down

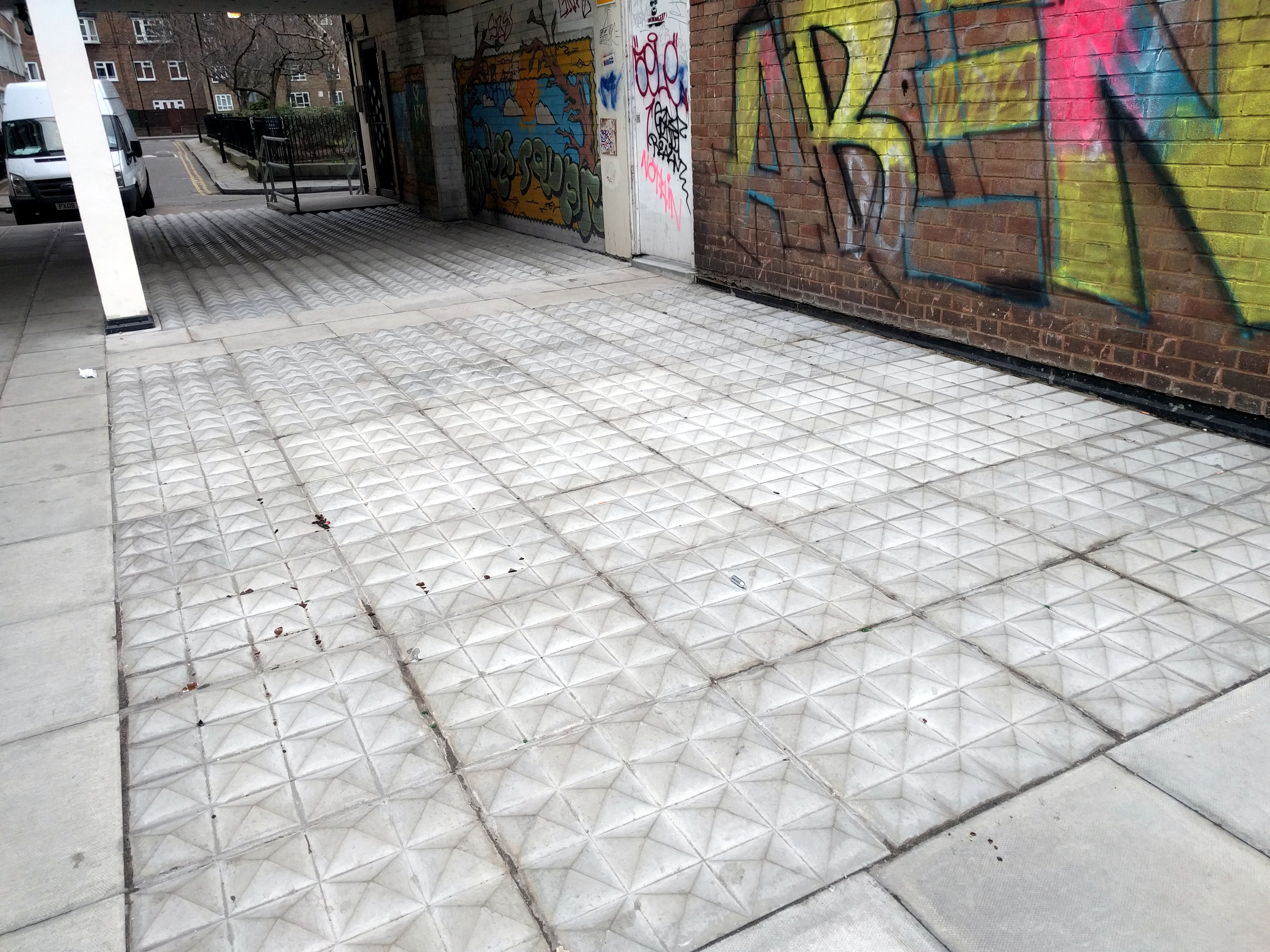
Floor spikes in Shoreditch, London, U.K, designed to prevent people from sleeping on the ground.

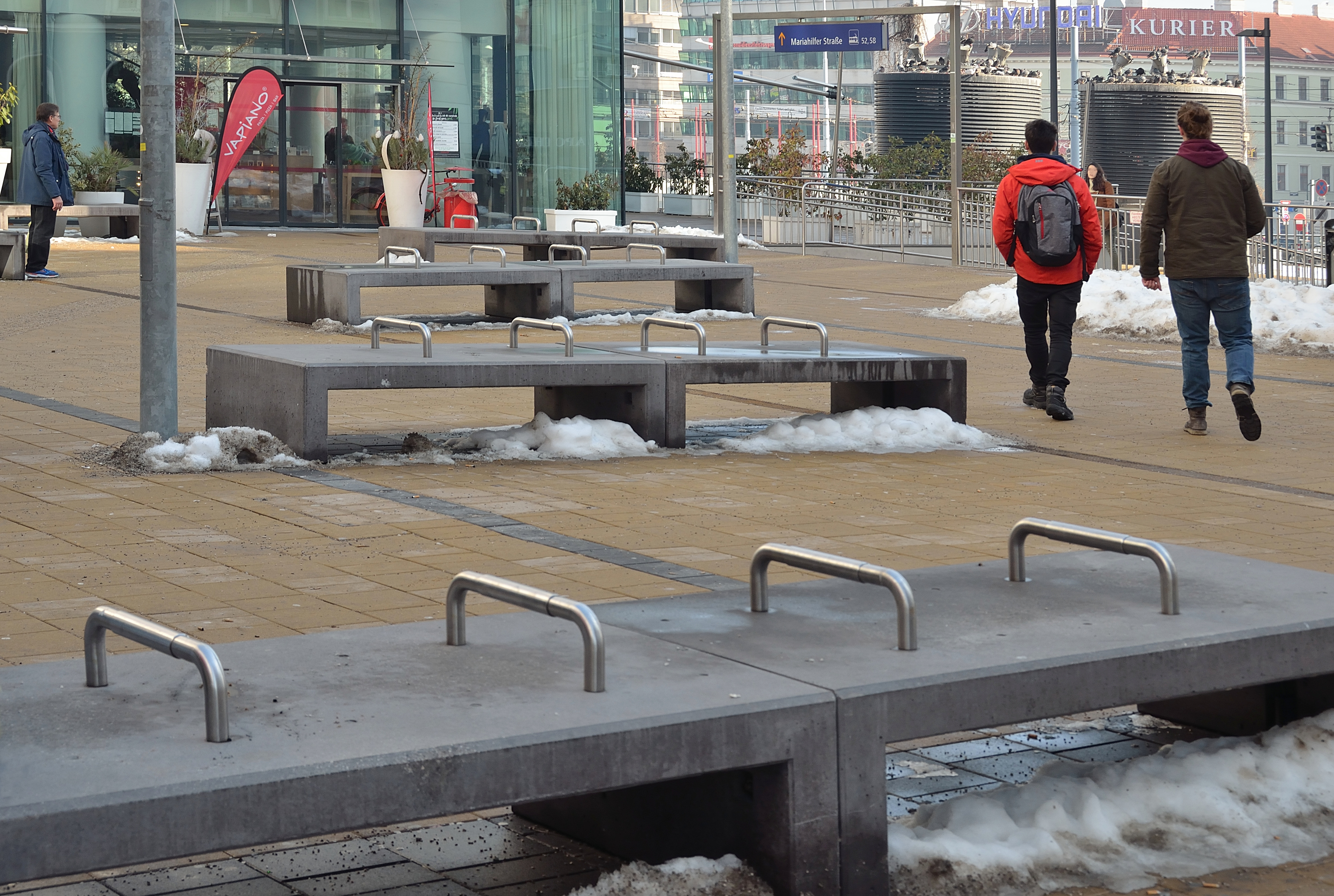
Benches with metal pipes (not armrest) to prevent lying down at a train station in Vienna

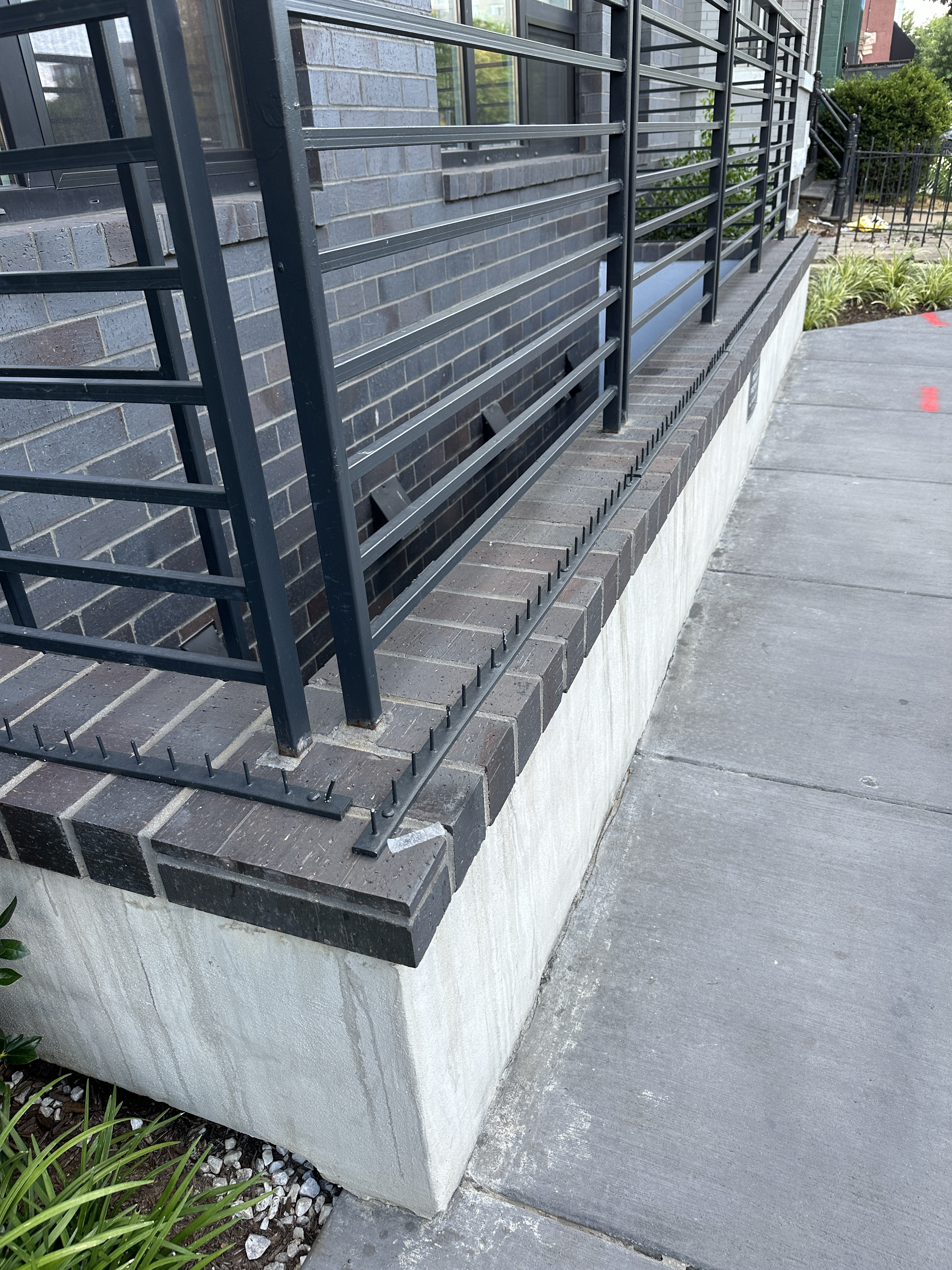
Pins prevent pedestrians from resting on ledge

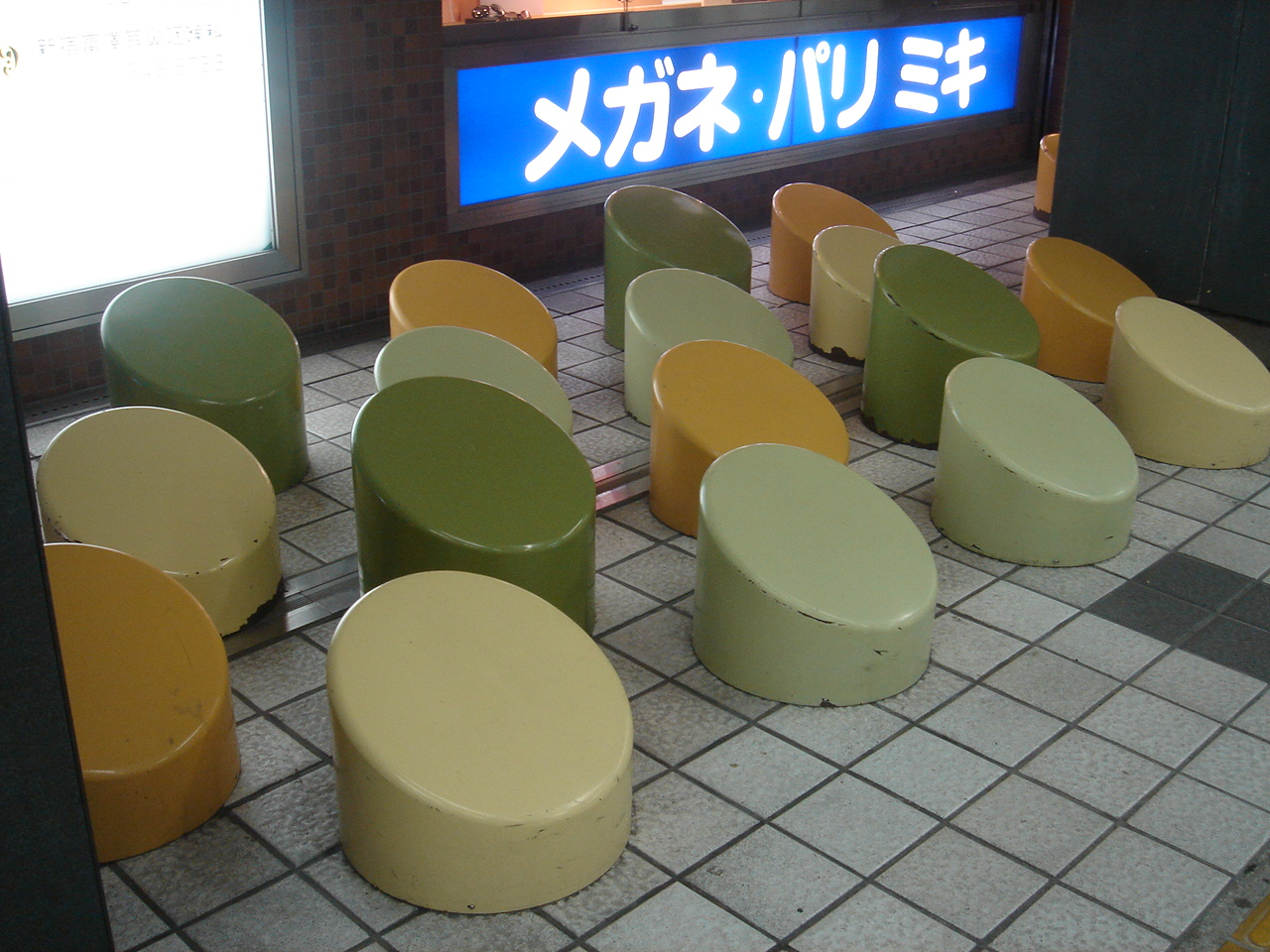
Anti-homeless object in Shinjuku Station underpass

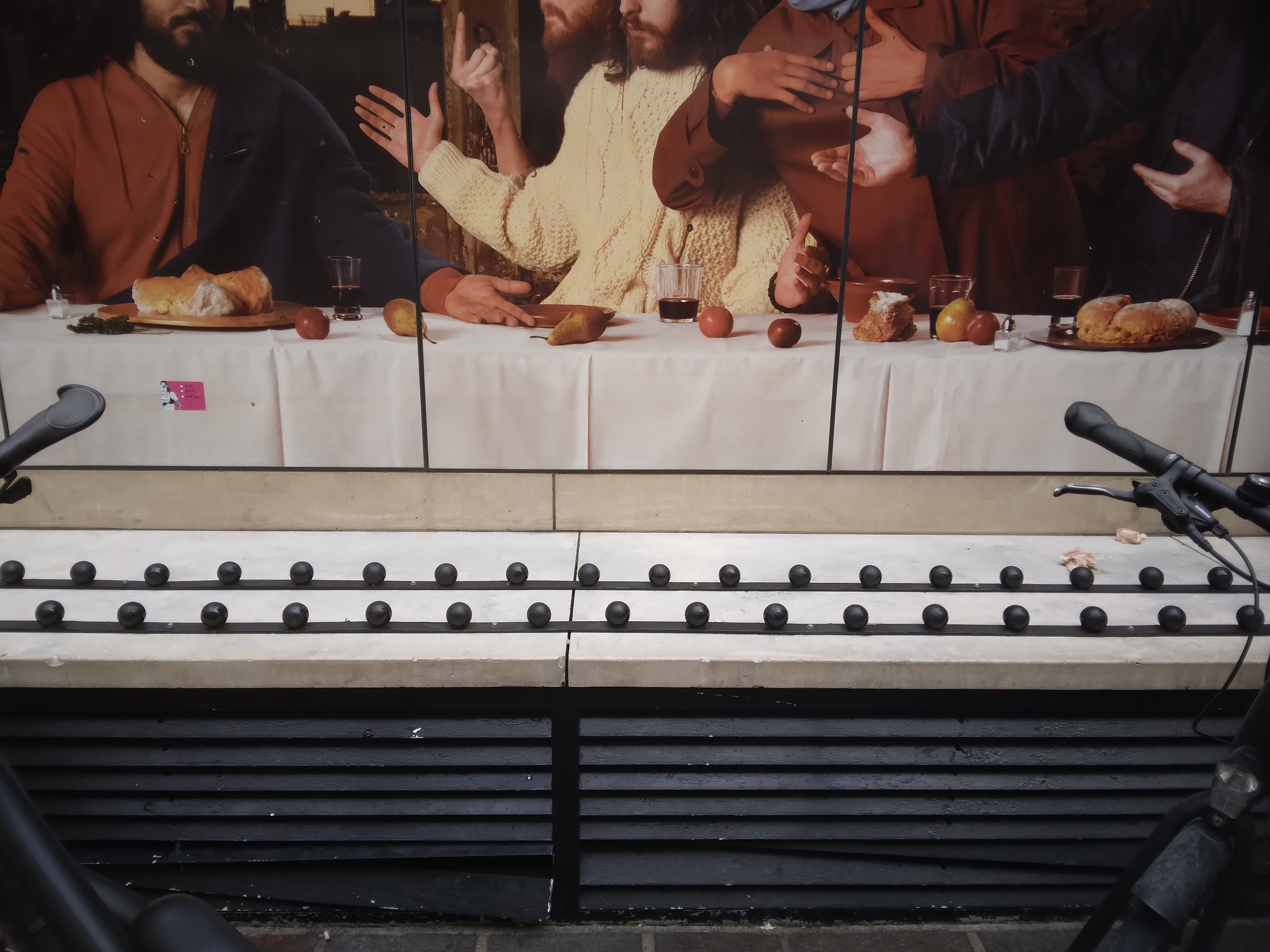
Strips of metal balls affixed to what was previously a bench in front of the Dublin's Last Supper mural in Dublin, Ireland

== See also ==
- Architecture terrible
- Anti-trespass panels, spiky rubber and wooden mats meant to discourage trespass on or near rail tracks
- Bird control spike
- Defensible space theory
- Defensive design
- Functionalism (architecture)
- Idiot-proof
- Natural surveillance
- New Urbanism
- Privately owned public space
- Social model of disability
- Urban vitality
