= Koepelgevangenis =

Koepelgevangenis may refer to one of these prisons:

- Koepelgevangenis (Arnhem)
- Koepelgevangenis (Breda)
- Koepelgevangenis (Haarlem)

See also:

- Panopticon, the type of prison used.
- Jeremy Bentham, who came up with the Panopticon idea.
