= Panoptykon Foundation =

Panoptykon Foundation (Polish: Fundacja Panoptykon) is a Polish NGO whose primary goal is to defend basic freedom and human rights against threats posed by the development of modern surveillance technologies. The foundation's activities are part of a broader research field concerned with the phenomenon of surveillance society.

The foundation was established on 17 April 2009 by Katarzyna Szymielewicz, Małgorzata Szumańska, Piotr Drobek and Krystian Legierski.

== Goals ==
The primary goals of the foundation are:

- Protection of the human rights in the surveillance society;
- Initiating and enhancing the level of public debate over the mechanisms and technologies enabling surveillance of the society and further usage of data collected on citizens/entities;
- Involving in research initiatives concerned with the development of the surveillance society and analysis of the social consequences of that phenomenon;
- Involvement in educational projects, will raise the popular knowledge of human rights and freedoms, as well as enhance public awareness of the dangers surrounding the development of the surveillance society.

== Activities ==
The foundation organizes, maintains or takes part in the following activities:

- monitoring how improper use of modern technology by the government or commercial entities like multinational corporations can threaten civil rights and liberties;
- analyzing current and proposed surveillance and modern technology-related legislation both in Poland and the EU;
- studying whether proposed legislation does not encroach on information autonomy, does not lead to social exclusion or human rights abuse;
- assessing the risks related to the development of modern surveillance society technology in Poland;
- taking action when the risks materialize in the form of law violation, abuse of power or an increase in social tensions;
- provoking a public discussion on the threats and problems related to the development of a surveillance society both in Poland and in the world.

== Name of the foundation ==
The name of the foundation is a reference to Jeremy Bentham's concept of a special prison, the Panopticon; in this prison, a guard can constantly monitor the activities of the inmates from a central surveillance station in the building while remaining unseen, the idea behind this solution is that it would prompt the inmates into auto-censorship; it would force them to control their own behavior because of fear that they might be watched.

The concept of the Panopticon was developed further by Michel Foucault who extrapolated the concept on society as a whole. The French thinker claimed that we no longer need to build the Panopticon or be prisoners in order to be affected by constant and omnipresent surveillance. A modern society can be perceived as the Panopticon on its own, with each of us being subject to its constant control.

== Structure ==
The foundation is governed by the board consisting of three members: Katarzyna Szymielewicz, Anna Obem and Wojciech Klicki.

== Interventions ==
The first intervention of the Panoptykon Foundation took the form of a campaign against compulsory personalization of the “city cards” in Warsaw – cards which, when charged via proper payment, allowed the bearer to make unlimited use of Warsaw's public transportation system for a set amount of time. The Panoptykon Foundation demanded an alternative solution for those who were reluctant to share their personally identifiable information with Warsaw's Department of Public Transport (ZTM). The demands had backing on legal grounds, fe. ZTM's demands were questionable when confronted with the Polish privacy laws. At the same time, the foundation started a public campaign, “Mam Cię – bo Muszę” (“I have you – because I’m forced to”), encouraging the personalization's opponents to express themselves by requesting a city card with a protest-themed graphic design printed on it. The campaign was partly successful. Part of the city council, with help from the foundation's legal experts, prepared a project to reintroduce personal tickets that would not be registered in ZTM's databases. Support gathered for the project was also large enough to make the City Council prioritize it in the council sessions. Ultimately, however, the project did not make it to the voting stage.

The foundation was part of an NGO coalition opposed to the proposal of introducing a List Of Forbidden Websites and Services. The foundation was a member of the group responsible for formulating demands and representing the coalition during meetings with the government (also present during the 5 February 2010 meeting of PM Donald Tusk with the Internet users). The coalition's efforts and the campaign it mounted prompted the government to abandon the project. The coalition has not dismantled and still campaigns for systematic improvements in the law that would guarantee the security of fundamental rights on the Internet.

In 2011 the foundation opposed compulsory gynecological examination for women as well as proposed legislation changes related to the educational information system and health care information system. The foundation took action against the installation of microphone-equipped cameras in Mława and the monitoring system in a swimming pool facility in Łódź. The foundation also takes action against compulsory data retention, website blocking, the ACTA treaty or the PNR treaty (treaty on retention and sharing of airline passengers’ data)

== The Panoptykon Seminars ==
In the fall 2009 – summer 2011 period the foundation had organized public monthly meetings dedicated to modern social surveillance solutions. The following subjects were discussed during the meetings: visual monitoring systems, medical data gathering, employee control at the workplace, consolidation of public databases, Internet surveillance, control over poverty, telecommunications data retention or surveillance in education facilities.

In July 2011 the foundation organized a meeting with David Lyon, a renowned scholar dedicated to exploring the concept of the surveillance society. Prof. Lyons discussed multiple aspects of modern surveillance and its effects with Polish social scientists, journalists and thinkers.

== Publications ==
In the year 2011, the foundation issued two reports: „Internet and the basic rights. A brief overview of current regulatory issues” and “Surveillance 2011. A summary.”

The first report collects regulatory issues in the field of basic rights on the Internet; it helps to recognize basic challenges in regulation and explores several possible ways in which the regulation might develop. The other report focuses on current issues that highlight challenges and tensions related to modern surveillance practices: visual monitoring, telecommunications data retention and sharing, the sharing of information between various government services of different nations and the information systems of public health care and education providers. The report also explains the concept of a surveillance society and highlights its potential effects on basic rights and liberties.

== Finances ==
In 2009 the foundation operated without any funding and functioned thanks to the volunteer support. In 2010 the foundation due to statutory activities had an income of 230,036.60 PLN and reached 69,919.57 PLN in expenses resulting from statutory activities. The main sources of income were restricted grants from: The Batory Foundation (123,000 PLN), The Internet Society (US$10,000) and The Open Society Institute (US$75,000).

== See also ==
- EU Data Retention Directive
