= Landscapes of power =

Concept in political philosophy

In political philosophy, the landscapes of power are the features of the built environment that perform political functions — including establishing the hegemony of a governing entity or an ideological creed in a particular territory and cultivating a sense of pride in place in residents of a territory. Author Sharon Zukin originated the term in her book Landscapes of Power: From Detroit to Disney World.

== Examples ==
Jeremy Bentham's Panopticon is a prime example of how the organization of physical space performs some of the functions listed above — in this case, establishing the authority over a particular area. The Panopticon is a type of prison built with a circle of cells arranged around a guard tower. The occupants of these cells are visible to the guard, but the prisoners cannot see into the tower. They must consequently behave, as they would be under surveillance, or risk the possible consequences. The French philosopher Michel Foucault discussed the Panopticon in his book Discipline and Punish: The Birth of the Prison

There are 4 functions of landscape of power 1. to show who owns what 2. for nation building 3. to create identity and 4. to show who is in power. More commonplace landscapes of power might include monuments, memorials and, as Zukin argues, even cities themselves.

== See also ==
- Environmental psychology
- Disciplinary architecture
- Architecture terrible
