= Royal Panopticon of Science and Art =

The Royal Panopticon of Science and Art
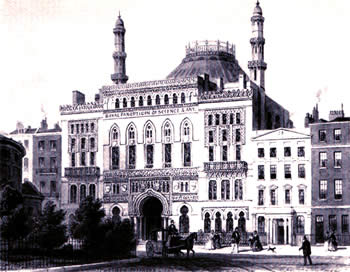

General information
- Location: Leicester Square, London
- Country: Great Britain
- Coordinates: 51°30′38″N 0°07′45″W

The Royal Panopticon of Science and Art was one of the grand social institutions and architectural splendours of Victorian London. It was given a royal charter in 1850 and in July 1851 a lease was taken out on a premium site for 60 years and building commenced. The Royal Panopticon of Science and Art was built on the eastern side of Leicester Square, opening on 18 March 1854.

== Exhibitions ==
A drawing of the interior, when The Royal Panopticon of Science and Art opened in 1854.

As a showcase venue for the very best achievements in sciences and arts of the time, it attracted 1,000 visitors per day. The rotunda at the centre of the building was encircled with a 91-metre frieze, creating a panathenaic procession in Elgin Marbles. The interior reflected the taste for religiously meaningless ornament. The panopticon cells were designed as reproductions of the Arch of Titus, Temple of Vesta, grottas and conservatories, while the wallpaper was changed frequently and displayed Arabic script. The interior design of the Royal Panopticon of Science and Art emerged from the contemporary taste for recreational learning, which had been pioneered in London through the Great Exhibition in 1851. In 1854 the work on the building that was to house the Royal Panopticon of Science and Art was completed.

Visitors of the Royal Panopticon of Science and Art could view changing exhibits, including vacuum flasks, a pin making machine and a cook stove. Visitors engaged in intellectual improvement as a leisure activity, while at the same time a competitive entertainment industry emerged in London. According to The Athenaeum the Royal Panopticon of Science and Art was the most "delightful lounge in London" which exhibited music, large fountains, interesting experiments and provided opportunities for shopping. Scientists that practiced at the Royal Panopticon of Science and Art also taught interested students. For example, George Frederick Ansell taught chemistry at the Royal Panopticon and his student Herbert McLeod went on to study at the Royal College of Chemistry.

== Closure ==
Two years after opening the amateur science panopticon project closed and the building was sold in 1856. The grand building re-opened as the Alhambra Theatre of Variety.

== Architecture ==
The Royal Panopticon of Science and Arts was a building flanked by minarets. This was a very large building for the time. The façade had tiles made by Mintons, shields and coats of arms of the most prominent scientists, writers and artists, including Oliver Goldsmith and Humphry Davy.
