= Panopticon =

Prison design

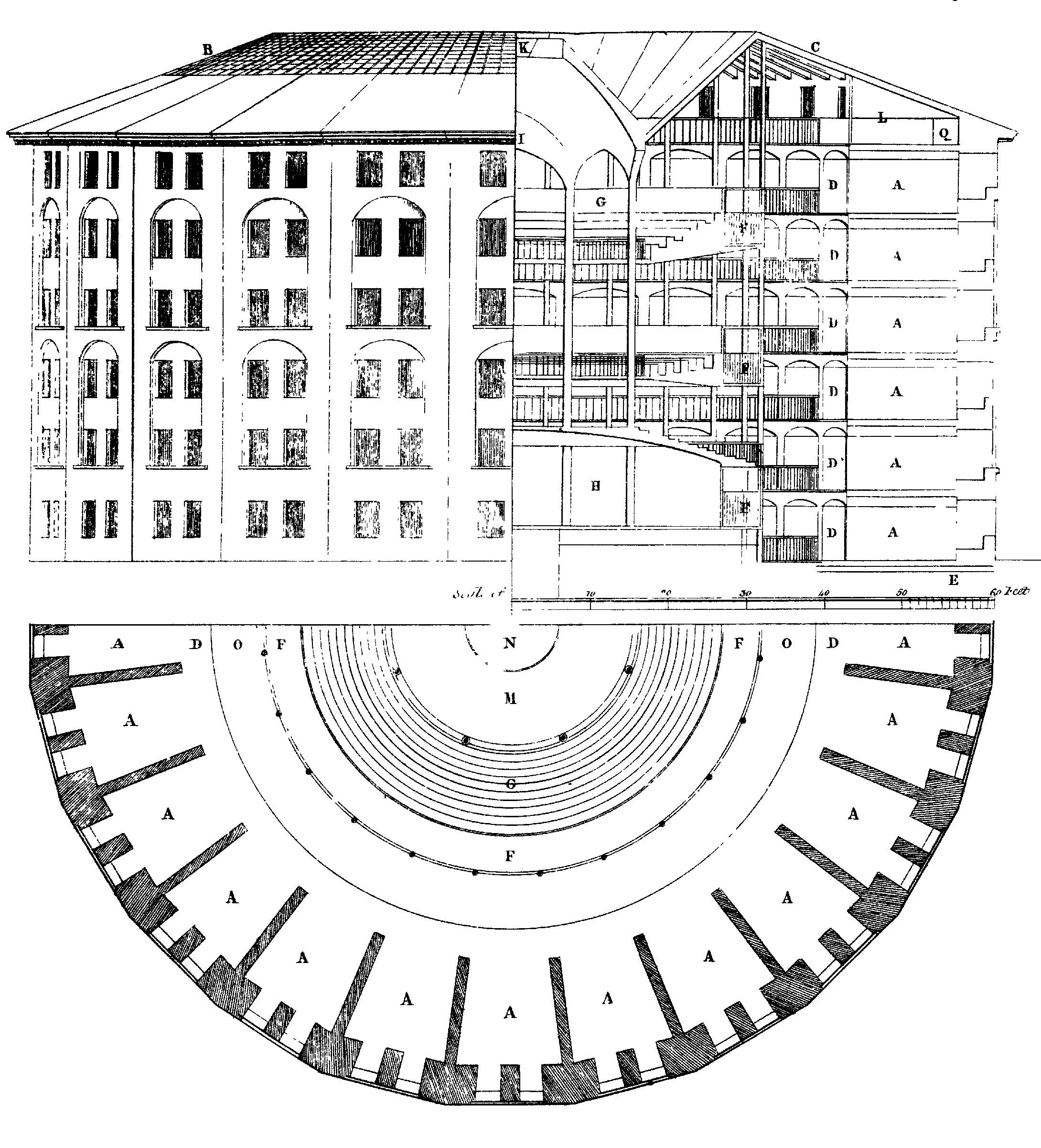
This plan of Jeremy Bentham's panopticon prison was drawn by Willey Reveley in 1791.

The panopticon is a design of institutional building with an inbuilt system of control, originated by the English philosopher and social theorist Jeremy Bentham in the 18th century. The concept is to allow all prisoners of an institution to be observed by a single prison officer, without the inmates knowing whether or not they are being watched.

Although it is physically impossible for the single guard to observe all the inmates' cells at once, the fact that the inmates cannot know when they are being watched motivates them to act as though they are all being watched at all times. They are effectively compelled to self-regulation. The architecture consists of a rotunda with an inspection house at its centre. From the centre, the manager or staff are able to watch the inmates. Bentham conceived the basic plan as being equally applicable to hospitals, schools, sanatoriums, and asylums. He devoted most of his efforts to developing a design for a panopticon prison, so the term now usually refers to that.

== Conceptual history ==
This computer rendered video shows how Bentham's panopticon would have appeared if built.

Section view of a panopticon prison drawn by Willey Reveley, circa 1791. The cells are marked with (H); a skylight (M) was to provide light and ventilation.

Plan view of the panopticon prison, by Reveley, 1791

The word panopticon derives from the Greek word for "all seeing" – panoptes. In 1785, Jeremy Bentham, an English social reformer and founder of utilitarianism, travelled to Krichev in Mogilev Governorate of the Russian Empire (modern Belarus) to visit his brother, Samuel, who accompanied Prince Potemkin. Bentham arrived in Krichev in early 1786 and stayed for almost two years. While residing with his brother in Krichev, Bentham sketched out the concept of the panopticon in letters. Bentham applied his brother's ideas on the constant observation of workers to prisons. Back in England, Bentham, with the assistance of his brother, continued to develop his theory on the panopticon. Prior to fleshing out his ideas of a panopticon prison, Bentham had drafted a complete penal code and explored fundamental legal theory. While in his lifetime Bentham was a prolific letter writer, he published little and remained obscure to the public until his death.

Bentham thought that the chief mechanism that would bring the manager of the panopticon prison in line with the duty to be humane would be publicity. Bentham tried to put his duty and interest junction principle into practice by encouraging a public debate on prisons. Bentham's inspection principle applied not only to the inmates of the panopticon prison, but also the manager. The unaccountable gaoler was to be observed by the general public and public officials. The apparently constant surveillance of the prison inmates by the panopticon manager and the occasional observation of the manager by the general public were to solve the age old philosophic question: "Who guards the guards?"

Bentham continued to develop the panopticon concept, as industrialisation advanced in England and an increasing number of workers were required to work in ever larger factories. Bentham commissioned drawings from an architect, Willey Reveley. Bentham reasoned that if the prisoners of the panopticon prison could be seen but never knew when they were watched, the prisoners would need to follow the rules. Bentham also thought that Reveley's prison design could be used for factories, asylums, hospitals, and schools.

Bentham remained bitter throughout his later life about the rejection of the panopticon scheme, convinced that it had been thwarted by the king and an aristocratic elite. It was largely because of his sense of injustice and frustration that he developed his ideas of sinister interest – that is, of the vested interests of the powerful conspiring against a wider public interest – which underpinned many of his broader arguments for reform.

== Prison design ==
The Building circular – an iron cage, glazed – a glass lantern about the size of Ranelagh – The Prisoners in their Cells, occupying the Circumference – The Officers, the Centre. By Blinds, and other contrivances, the Inspectors concealed from the observation of the Prisoners: hence the sentiment of a sort of invisible omnipresence. – The whole circuit reviewable with little, or, if necessary, without any, change of place.

— Jeremy Bentham (1791). Panopticon, or The Inspection House

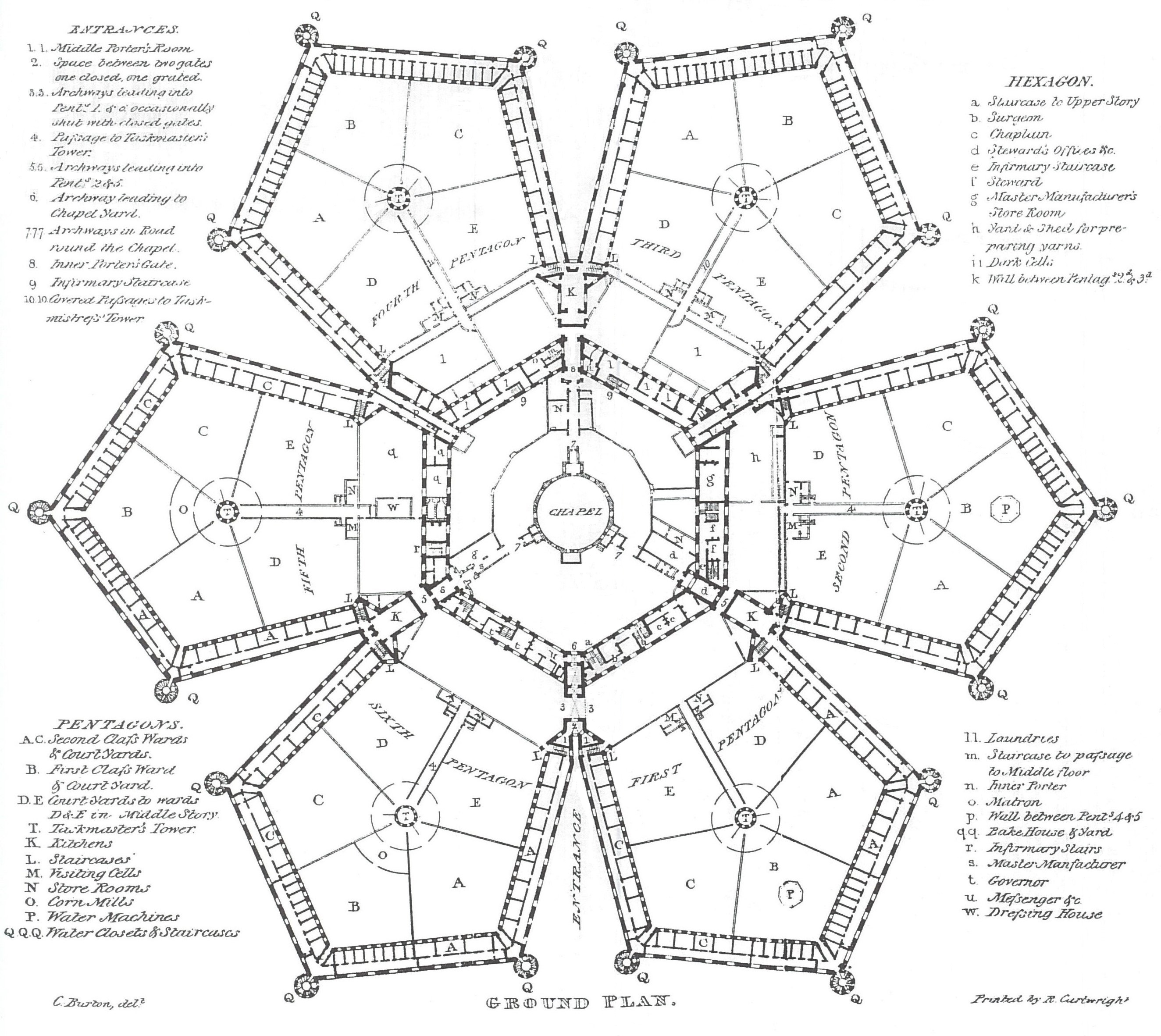
The plan of Millbank Prison has six pentagons with a tower at the centre arranged around a chapel.

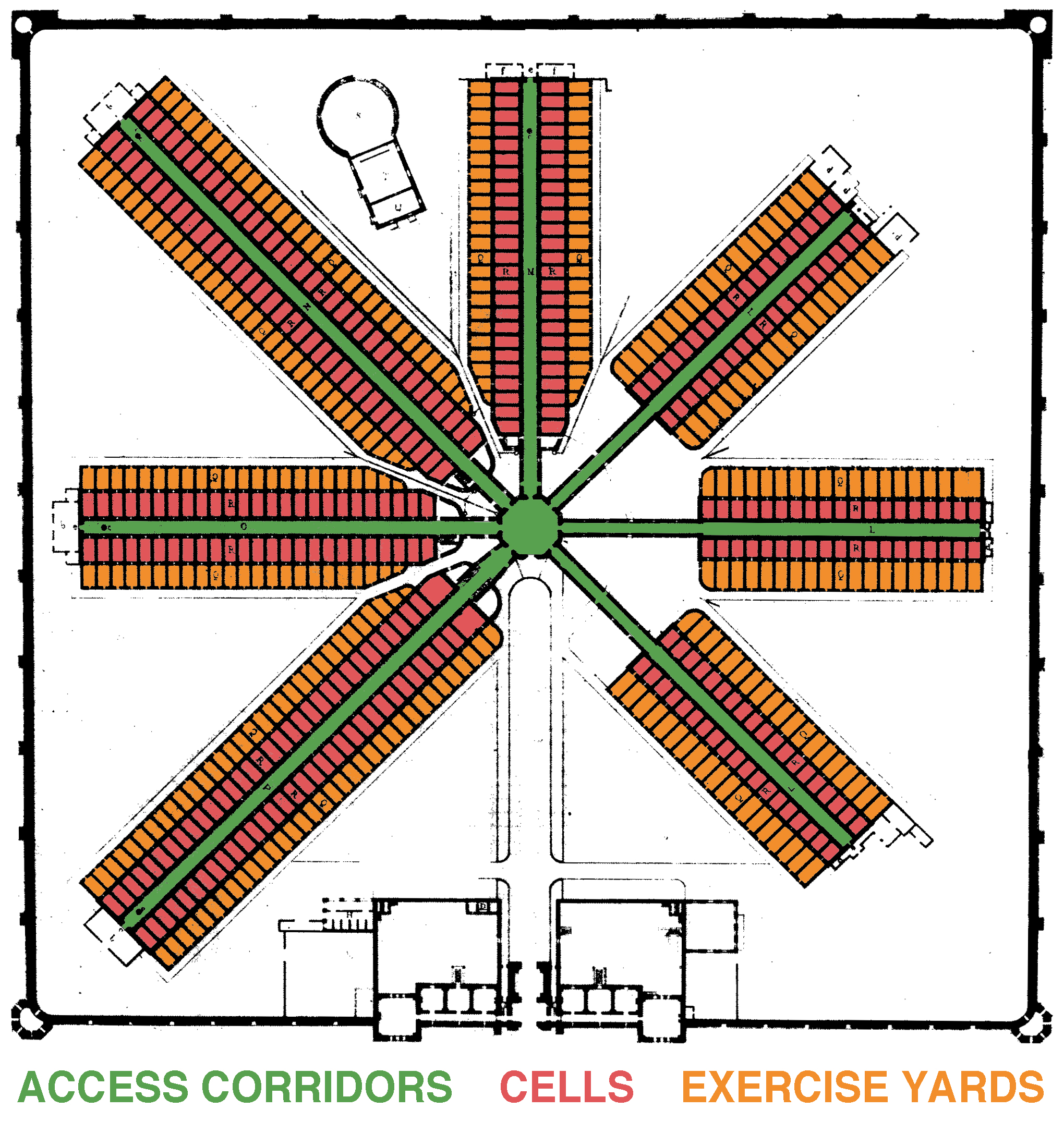
Annotated floor plan of Eastern State Penitentiary in 1836

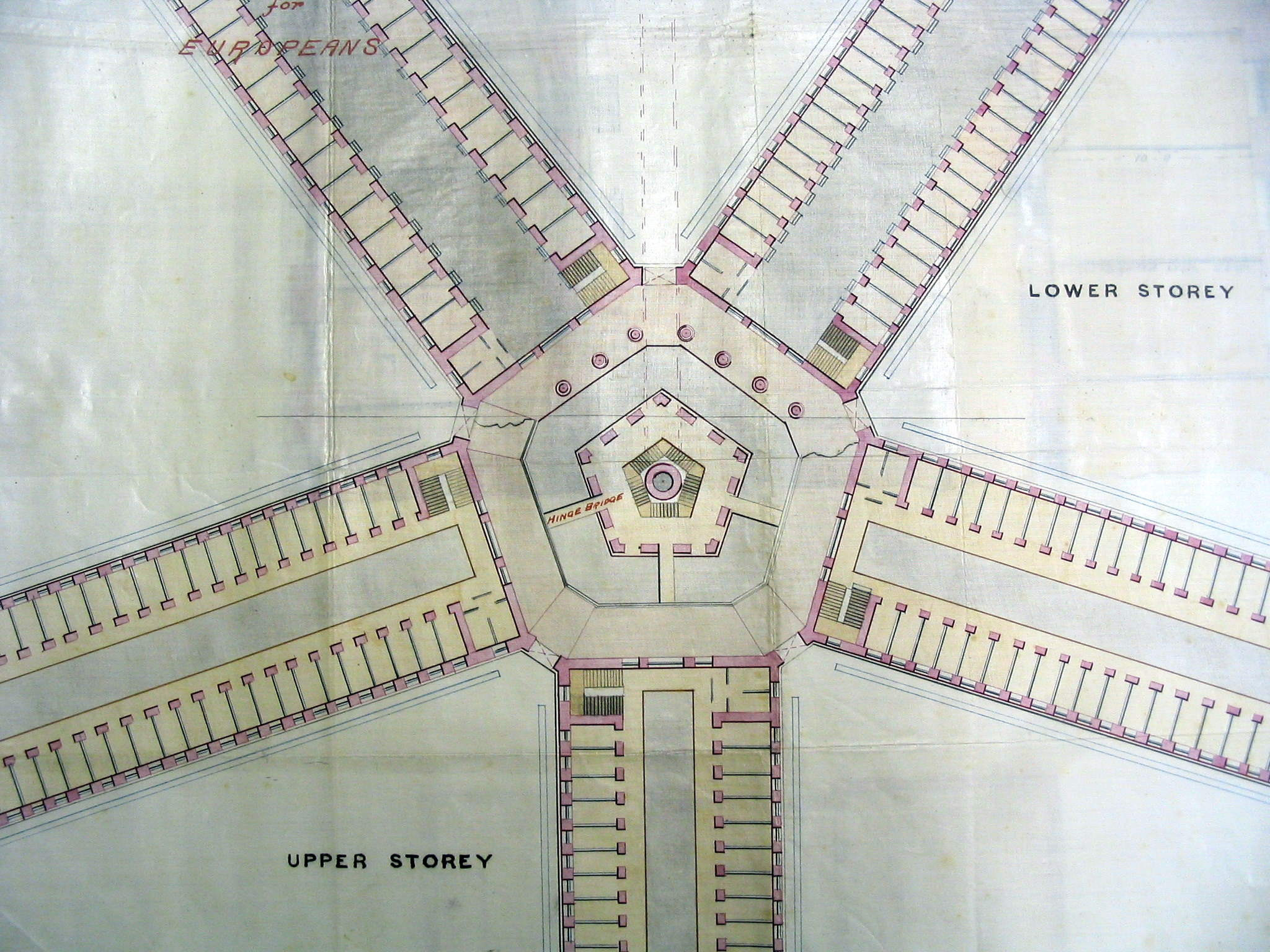
An 1880s architectural drawing by John Frederick Adolphus McNair depicts a proposed prison at Outram, Singapore, that was never built.

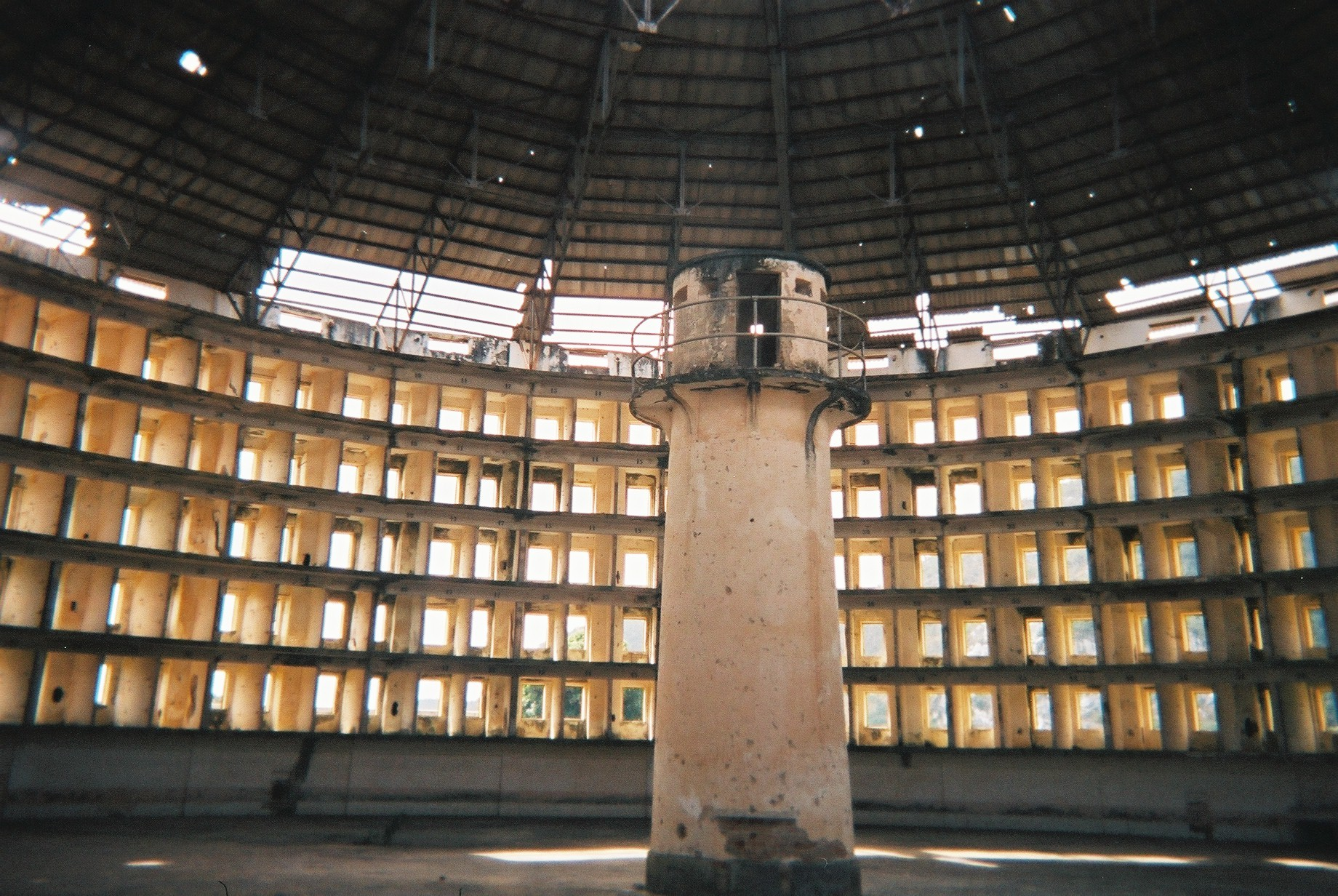
Inside one of the buildings of the Presidio Modelo

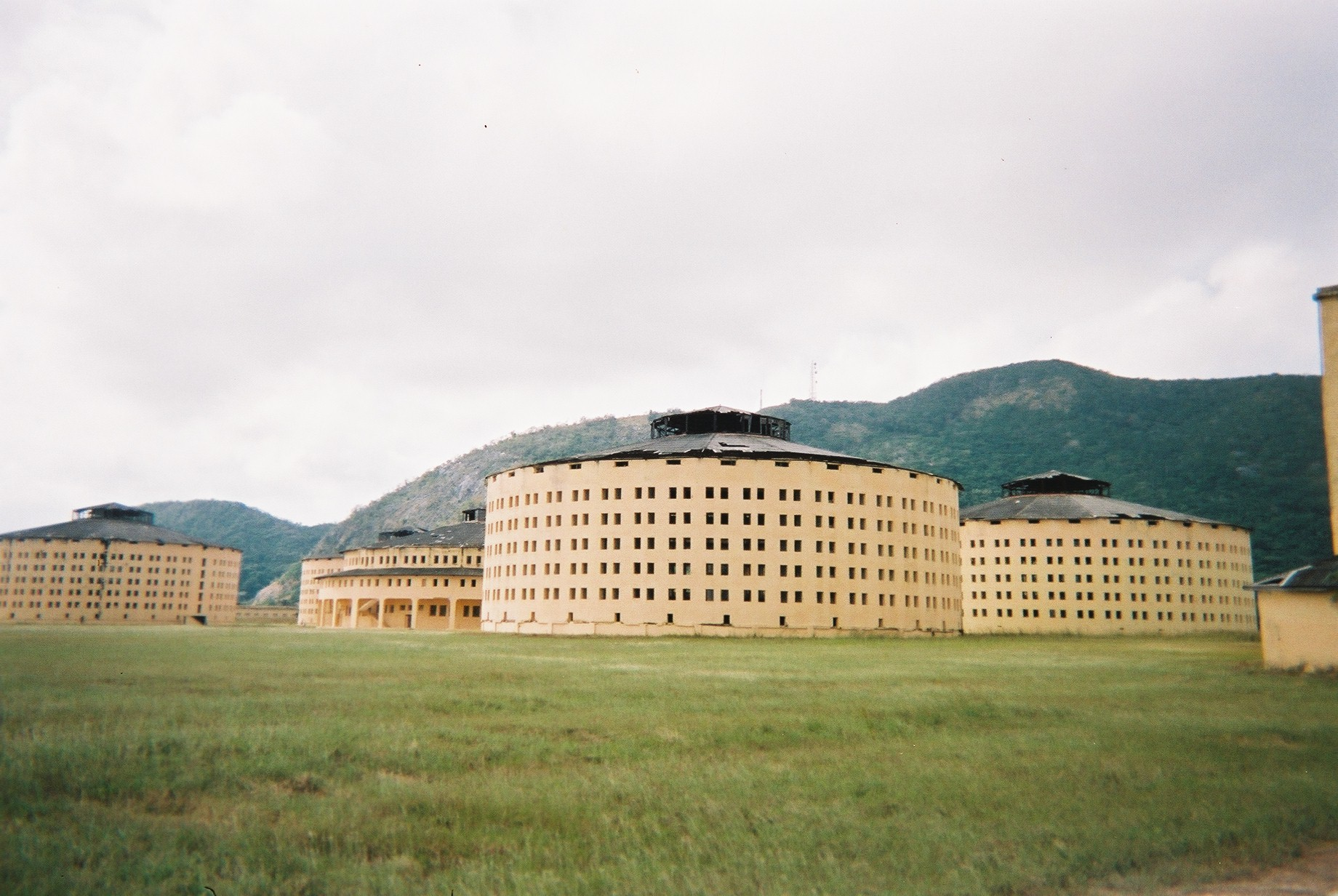
The disused Presidio Modelo in Cuba is a museum as of 2005.

Bentham's proposal for a panopticon prison was met with great interest among British government officials not only because it incorporated the pleasure-pain principle developed by the materialist philosopher Thomas Hobbes, but also because Bentham joined the emerging discussion on political economy. Bentham argued that the confinement of the prison "is his punishment, preventing [the prisoner from] carrying the work to another market". Key to Bentham's proposals and efforts to build a panopticon prison in Millbank at his own expense, was the "means of extracting labour" out of prisoners in the panopticon. In his 1791 writing Panopticon, or The Inspection House, Bentham reasoned that those working fixed hours needed to be overseen. Also, in 1791, Jean Philippe Garran de Coulon presented a paper on Bentham's panopticon prison concepts to the National Legislative Assembly in revolutionary France.

In 1812, persistent problems with Newgate Prison and other London prisons prompted the British government to fund the construction of a prison in Millbank at the taxpayers' expense. Based on Bentham's panopticon plans, the National Penitentiary opened in 1821. Millbank Prison, as it became known, was controversial, and developed a poor reputation due to outbreaks of disease. Nevertheless, the British government placed an increasing emphasis on prisoners doing meaningful work, instead of engaging in humiliating and meaningless kill-times. Bentham lived to see Millbank Prison built and did not support the approach taken by the British government. His writings had virtually no immediate effect on the architecture of taxpayer-funded prisons that were to be built. Between 1818 and 1821, a small prison for women was built in Lancaster. It has been observed that the architect Joseph Gandy modelled it very closely on Bentham's panopticon prison plans. The K-wing near Lancaster Castle prison is a semi-rotunda with a central tower for the supervisor and five storeys with nine cells on each floor.

It was the Pentonville prison, which was built in London after Bentham's death in 1832, that was to serve as a model for a further 54 prisons in Victorian Britain. Built between 1840 and 1842 according to the plans of Joshua Jebb, Pentonville prison had a central hall with radial prison wings. It has been claimed that Bentham's panopticon influenced the radial design of 19th-century prisons built on the principles of the "separate system", including Eastern State Penitentiary in Philadelphia, which opened in 1829. But the Pennsylvania–Pentonville architectural model with its radial prison wings was not designed to facilitate constant surveillance of individual prisoners. Guards had to walk from the hall along the radial corridors and could only observe prisoners in their cells by looking through the cell door's peephole.

In 1925, Cuba's president Gerardo Machado set out to build a modern prison, based on Bentham's concepts and employing the latest scientific theories on rehabilitation. A Cuban envoy tasked with studying US prisons in advance of the construction of Presidio Modelo had been greatly impressed with Stateville Correctional Center in Illinois and the cells in the new circular prison were too faced inwards towards a central guard tower. Because of the shuttered guard tower, the guards could see the prisoners, but the prisoners could not see the guards. Cuban officials theorised that the prisoners would "behave" if there was a probable chance that they were under surveillance, and once prisoners behaved, they could be rehabilitated.

Between 1926 and 1931, the Cuban government built four such panopticons connected with tunnels to a massive central structure that served as a community centre. Each panopticon had five floors with 93 cells. In keeping with Bentham's ideas, none of the cells had doors. Prisoners were free to roam the prison and participate in workshops to learn a trade or become literate, with the hope being that they would become productive citizens. However, by the time Fidel Castro was imprisoned at Presidio Modelo, the four circulars were packed with 6,000 men, every floor was filled with trash, there was no running water, food rations were meagre, and the government supplied only the bare necessities of life.

In the Netherlands, historic panopticon prisons include Breda, Arnhem, and Haarlem penitentiary. However, these circular prisons with approximately 400 cells fail as panopticons because the inward-facing cell windows were so small that guards could not see the entire cell. The lack of surveillance that was actually possible in prisons with small cells and doors discounts many circular prison designs from being a panopticon as it had been envisaged by Bentham. In 2006, one of the first digital panopticon prisons opened in the Dutch province of Flevoland. Every prisoner in the Lelystad Prison wears an electronic tag and by design, only six guards are needed for 150 prisoners instead of the usual 15 or more.

== Architecture of other institutions ==
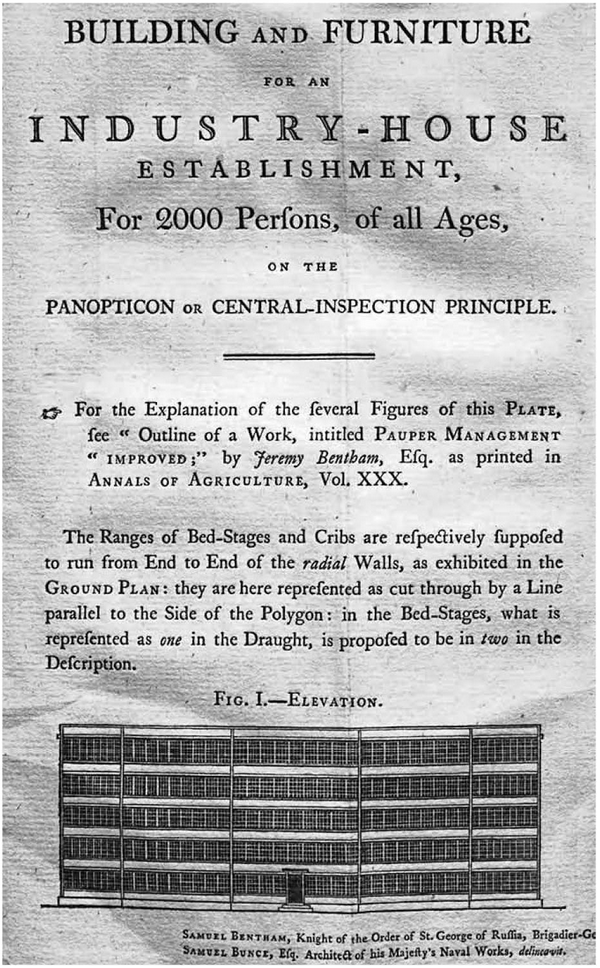
Bentham's 1812 industry-house for 2000 persons

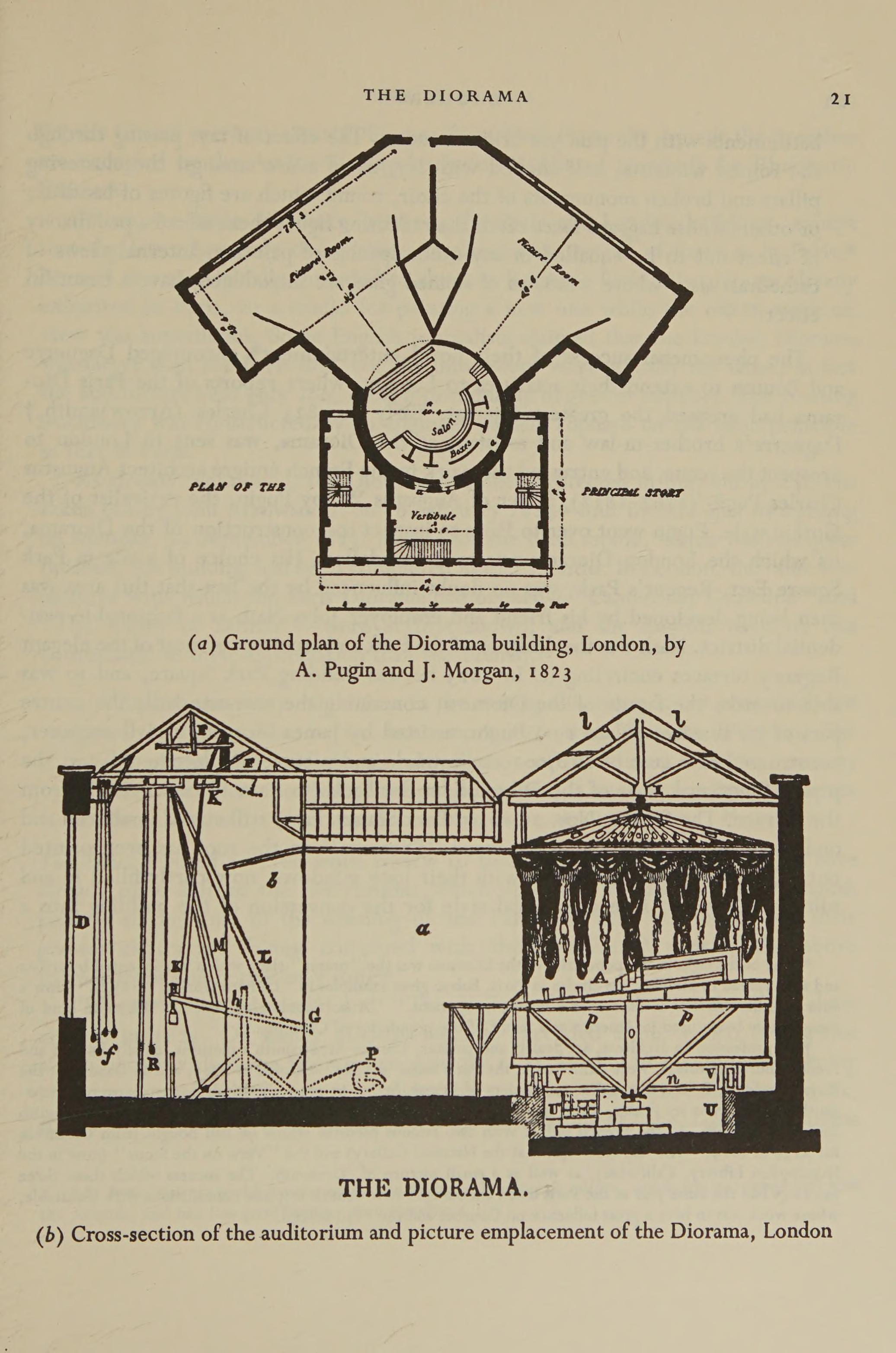
Ground-plan of the Diorama Building, London 1823

Jeremy Bentham's panopticon architecture was not original, as rotundas had been used before, as for example in industrial buildings. However, Bentham turned the rotund architecture into a structure with a societal function, so that humans themselves became the object of control. The idea for a panopticon had been prompted by his brother Samuel Bentham's work in Russia and had been inspired by existing architectural traditions. Samuel Bentham had studied at the Ecole Militaire in 1751, and at about 1773 the prominent French architect Claude-Nicolas Ledoux had finished his designs for the Royal Saltworks at Arc-et-Senans. William Strutt in cooperation with his friend Jeremy Bentham built a round mill in Belper, so that one supervisor could oversee an entire shop floor from the centre of the round mill. The mill was built between 1803 and 1813 and was used for production until the late 19th century. It was demolished in 1959. In Bentham's 1812 writing Pauper management improved: particularly by means of an application of the Panopticon principle of construction, he included a building for an "industry-house establishment" that could hold 2000 persons. In 1812 Samuel Bentham, who had by then risen to brigadier-general, tried to persuade the British Admiralty to construct an arsenal panopticon in Kent. Before returning home to London he had constructed a panopticon in 1807, near St Petersburg, which served as a training centre for young men wishing to work in naval manufacturing. The panopticon, Bentham writes:

will be found applicable, I think, without exception to all establishments whatsoever, in which within a space not too large to be covered or commanded by buildings, a number of persons are meant to be kept under inspections. No matter how different or even opposite the purpose.

— Jeremy Bentham (1791). Panopticon, or The Inspection House

A drawing of the interior design, when The Royal Panopticon of Science and Art opened in 1854

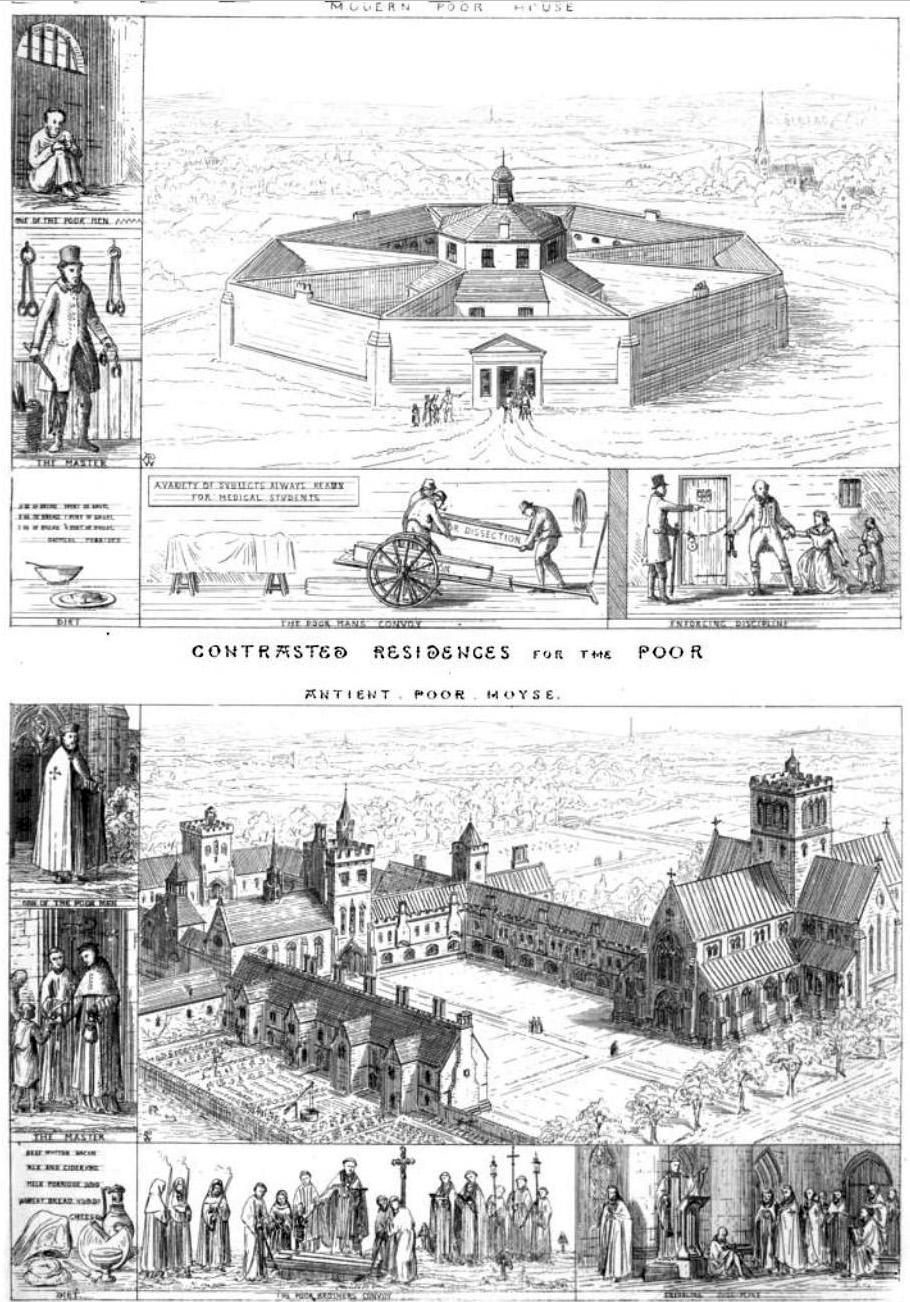
A plate by Pugin

Though no panopticon was built during Bentham's lifetime, his principles prompted considerable discussion and debate. Shortly after Jeremy Bentham's death in 1832 his ideas were criticised by Augustus Pugin, who in 1841 published the second edition of his work Contrasts in which one plate shows a "Modern Poor House". He contrasted an English medieval gothic town in 1400 with the same town in 1840 where broken spires and factory chimneys dominate the skyline, with a panopticon-like building in the foreground replacing the Christian hospice. Pugin, who went on to become one of the most influential 19th-century writers on architecture, was influenced by Hegel and German idealism. In 1835 the first annual report of the Poor Law Commission included two designs by the commission's architect Sampson Kempthorne. His Y-shape and cross-shape designs for workhouse expressed the panopticon principle by positioning the master's room as the central point. The designs provided for the segregation of occupants and maximum visibility from the centre. Professor David Rothman came to the conclusion that Bentham's panopticon prison did not inform the architecture of early asylums in the United States.

According to professor Donald Preziosi, the panopticon prison of Bentham resonates with the memory theatre of Giulio Camillo, where the sitting observer is at the centre and the phenomena are categorised in an array, which makes comparison, distinction, contrast and variation legible. Among the architectural references Bentham quoted for his panopticon prison was Ranelagh Gardens, a London pleasure garden with a dome built around 1742. At the centre of the rotunda beneath the dome was an elevated platform from which a 360 degrees panorama could be viewed, illuminated through skylights. Professor Nicholas Mirzoeff compares the panopticon with the 19th-century diorama, because the architecture is arranged so that the seer views cells or galleries.

In 1854, the work on the building that was to house the Royal Panopticon of Science and Art in London was completed. The rotunda at the centre of the building was encircled with a 91-meter procession. The interior reflected the taste for religiously meaningless ornament and emerged from the contemporary taste for recreational learning. Visitors of the Royal Panopticon of Science and Art could view changing exhibits, including vacuum flasks, a pin making machine, and a cook stove. However, a competitive entertainment industry emerged in London and despite the varying music, the large fountains, interesting experiments, and opportunities for shopping, two years after opening the amateur science panopticon project closed.

== Applied to social surveillance ==
In 1965, the conservative historian Shirley Robin Letwin traced the Fabian zest for social planning to early utilitarian thinkers. She argued that Bentham's pet gadget, the panopticon prison, was a device of such monstrous efficiency that it left no room for humanity. She accused Bentham of forgetting the dangers of unrestrained power and argued that "in his ardour for reform, Bentham prepared the way for what he feared". Recent libertarian thinkers began to regard Bentham's entire philosophy as having paved the way for totalitarian states. In the late 1960s, the American historian Gertrude Himmelfarb, who had published The Haunted House of Jeremy Bentham in 1965, was at the forefront of depicting Bentham's mechanism of surveillance as a tool of oppression and social control. David John Manning published The Mind of Jeremy Bentham in 1986, in which he reasoned that Bentham's fear of instability caused him to advocate ruthless social engineering and a society in which there could be no privacy or tolerance for the deviant.

In the mid-1970s, the panopticon was brought to the wider attention by the French psychoanalyst Jacques-Alain Miller and the French philosopher Michel Foucault. Foucault first came across the panopticon architecture when he studied the origins of clinical medicine and hospital architecture in the second half of the 18th century. In 1975, Foucault used the panopticon as metaphor for the modern disciplinary society in Discipline and Punish. According to Foucault, a disciplinary society had emerged in the 18th century, and this discipline consisted of techniques to reinforce the ordering of human complexities, with the ultimate aim of docility and utility in the system. He argued that discipline had replaced the pre-modern society of kings, and that the panopticon should not be understood as a building, but as a mechanism of power and a diagram of political technology.

When talking about the applications of the panopticon to political and social theory, Foucault writes:

The Panopticon [...] must be understood as a generalizable model of functioning; a way of deﬁning power relations in terms of the everyday life of men. No doubt Bentham presents it as a particular institution, closed in upon itself. [...] But the Panopticon must not be understood as a dream building: it is the diagram of a mechanism of power reduced to its ideal form; its functioning, abstracted from any obstacle, resistance or friction, must be represented as a pure architectural and optical system: it is in fact a ﬁgure of political technology that may and must be detached from any speciﬁc use.

— Michel Foucault, Discipline & Punish: The Birth of the Prison (1977)

Foucault argued that discipline had already crossed the technological threshold in the late 18th century, when the right to observe and accumulate knowledge had been extended from the prison to hospitals, schools, and later factories. In his historic analysis, Foucault reasoned that with the disappearance of public executions, pain had been gradually eliminated as punishment in a society ruled by reason. The modern prison in the 1970s, with its corrective technology, was rooted in the changing legal powers of the state. While acceptance for corporal punishment diminished, the state gained the right to administer more subtle methods of punishment, such as to observe. The French sociologist Henri Lefebvre studied urban space and Foucault's interpretation of the panopticon prison, arriving at the conclusion that spatiality is a social phenomenon. Lefebvre contended that architecture is no more than the relationship between the panopticon, people, and objects. In urban studies, academics such as Marc Schuilenburg argue that a different self-consciousness arises among humans who live in an urban area.

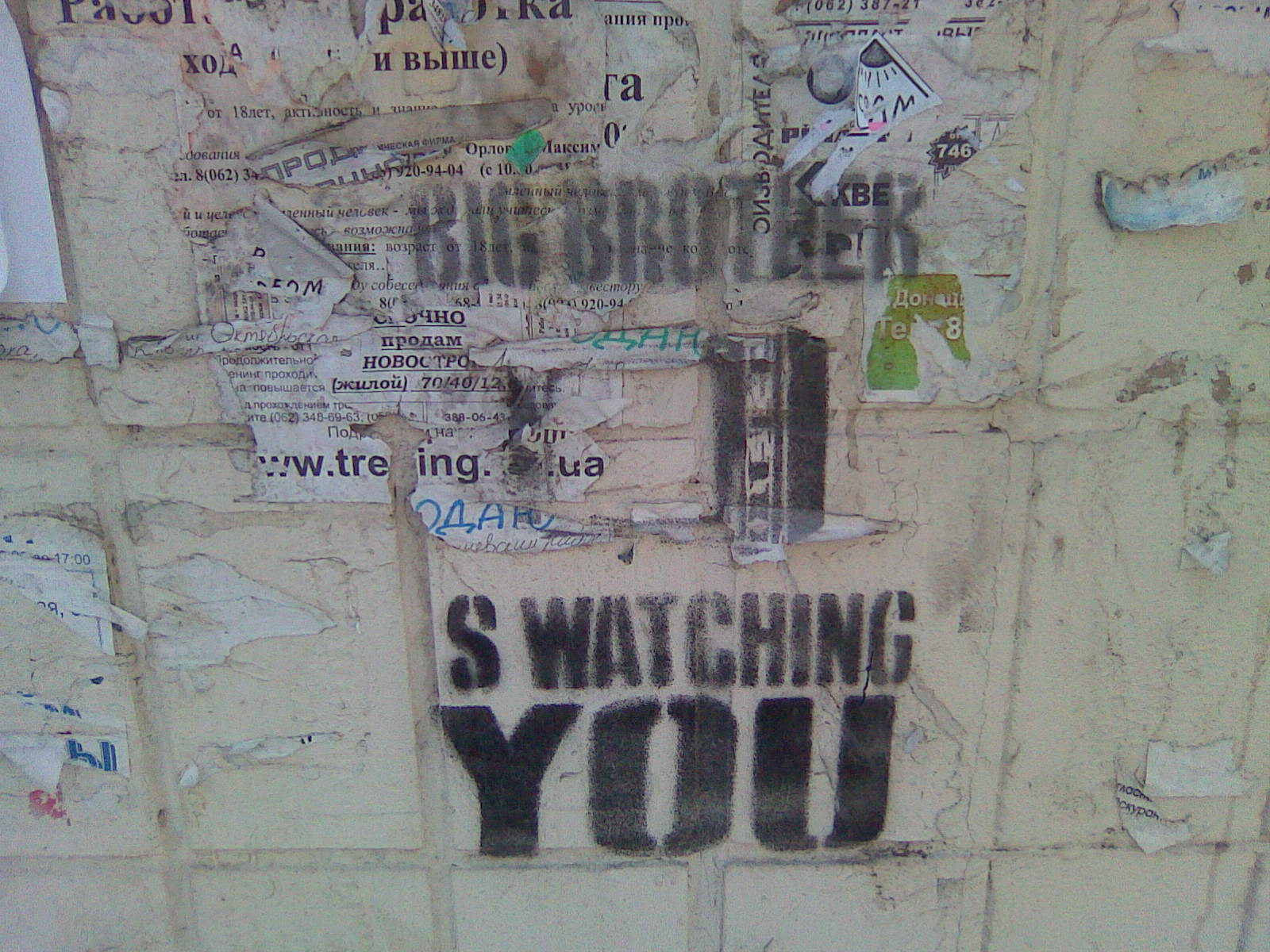
Wall of an industrial building in Donetsk, Ukraine, featuring a graffiti referencing Big Brother

In 1984, Michael Radford gained international attention for the cinematographic panopticon he had staged in the film Nineteen Eighty-Four. Of the telescreens in the landmark surveillance narrative Nineteen Eighty-Four (1949), George Orwell said: "there was of course no way of knowing whether you were being watched at any given moment ... you had to live ... in the assumption that every sound you made was overheard, and, except in darkness, every movement scrutinised". In Radford's film the telescreens were bidirectional and in a world with an ever increasing number of telescreen devices the citizens of Oceania were spied on more than they thought possible. In The Electronic Eye: The Rise of Surveillance Society (1994) the sociologist David Lyon concluded that "no single metaphor or model is adequate to the task of summing up what is central to contemporary surveillance, but important clues are available in Nineteen Eighty-Four and in Bentham's panopticon".

The French philosopher Gilles Deleuze shaped the emerging field of surveillance studies with the 1990 essay Postscript on the Societies of Control. Deleuze argued that the society of control is replacing the discipline society. With regards to the panopticon, Deleuze argued that "enclosures are moulds ... but controls are a modulation". Deleuze observed that technology had allowed physical enclosures, such as schools, factories, prisons and office buildings, to be replaced by a self-governing machine, which extends surveillance in a quest to manage production and consumption. Information circulates in the control society, just like products in the modern economy, and meaningful objects of surveillance are sought out as forward-looking profiles and simulated pictures of future demands, needs and risks are drawn up.

In 1997, Thomas Mathiesen in turn expanded on Foucault's use of the panopticon metaphor when analysing the effects of mass media on society. He argued that mass media such as broadcast television gave many people the ability to view the few from their own homes and gaze upon the lives of reporters and celebrities. Mass media has thus turned the discipline society into a viewer society. In the 1998 satirical science fiction film The Truman Show, the protagonist eventually escapes the OmniCam Ecosphere, the reality television show that, unknown to him, broadcasts his life around the clock and across the globe. But in 2002, Peter Weibel noted that the entertainment industry does not consider the panopticon as a threat or punishment, but as "amusement, liberation and pleasure". With reference to the Big Brother television shows of Endemol Entertainment, in which a group of people live in a container studio apartment and allow themselves to be recorded constantly, Weibel argued that the panopticon provides the masses with "the pleasure of power, the pleasure of sadism, voyeurism, exhibitionism, scopophilia, and narcissism". In 2006, Shoreditch TV became available to residents of the Shoreditch in London, so that they could tune in to watch CCTV footage live. The service allowed residents "to see what's happening, check out the traffic and keep an eye out for crime".

The Cornell University professor and information theorist Branden Hookway introduced the concept of a Panspectrons in 2000: an evolution of the panopticon to the effect that it does not define an object of surveillance more, but everyone and everything is monitored. The object is defined only in relation to a specific issue.

Paris School academic Didier Bigo coined the term "Banopticon" to describe a situation where profiling technologies are used to determine who to place under surveillance.

In their 2004 book Welcome to the Machine: Science, Surveillance, and the Culture of Control, Derrick Jensen and George Draffan called Bentham "one of the pioneers of modern surveillance" and argued that his panopticon prison design serves as the model for modern supermaximum security prisons, such as Pelican Bay State Prison in California. In the 2015 book Dark Matters: On the Surveillance of Blackness, Simone Browne noted that Bentham travelled on a ship carrying slaves as cargo while drafting his panopticon proposal. She argues that the structure of chattel slavery haunts the theory of the panopticon. She proposes that the 1789 plan of the slave ship Brookes should be regarded as the paradigmatic blueprint. Drawing on Didier Bigo's Banopticon, Browne argues that society is ruled by exceptionalism of power, where the state of emergency becomes permanent and certain groups are excluded on the basis of their future potential behaviour as determined through profiling.

=== Surveillance technology ===
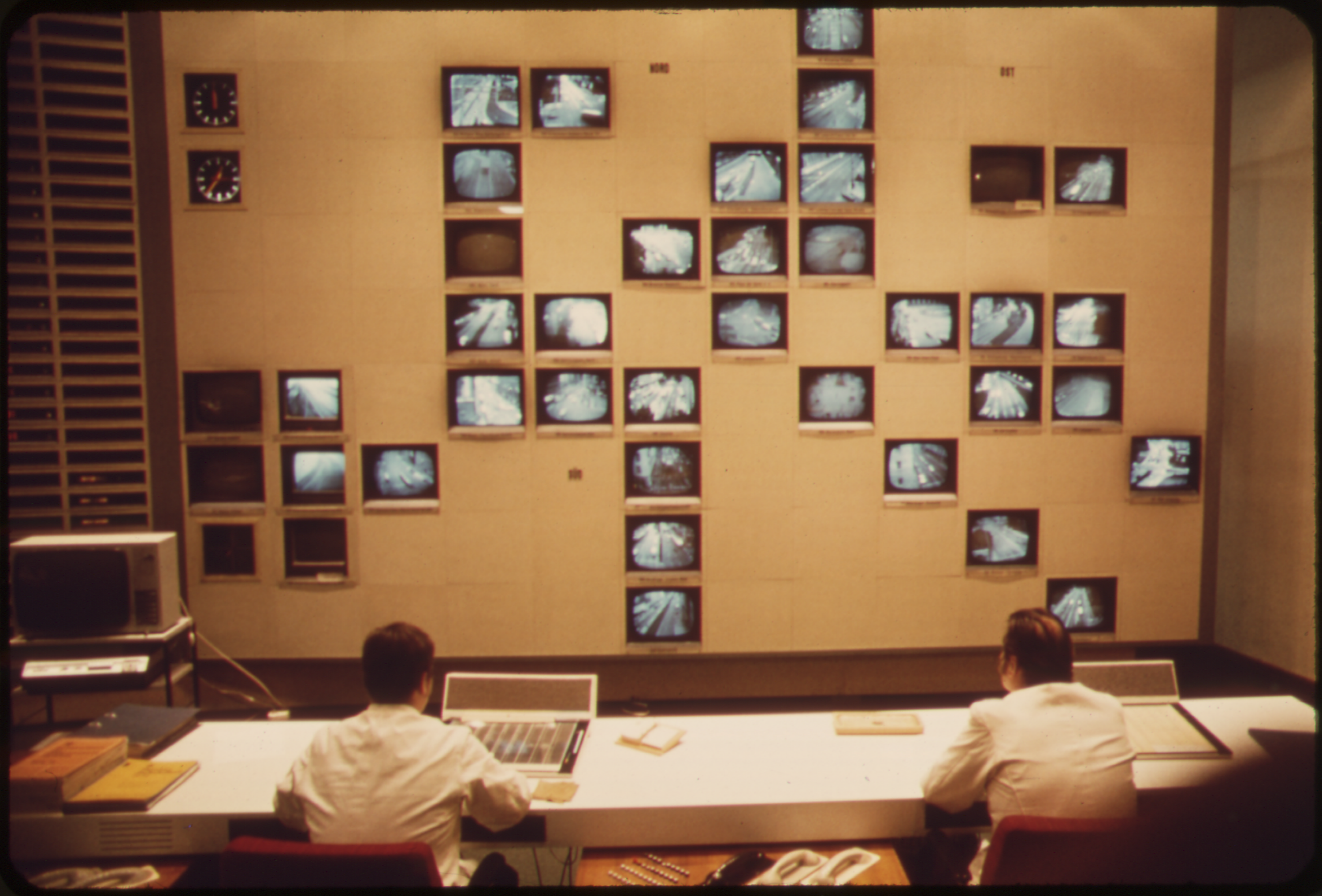
Closed circuit TV monitoring at the Central Police Control Station, Munich, 1973

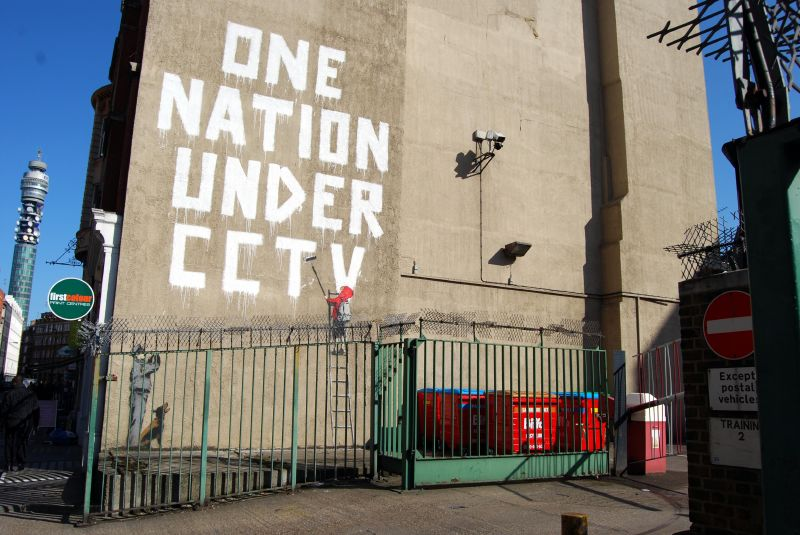
Graffiti about video surveillance

The metaphor of the panopticon prison has been employed to analyse the social significance of surveillance by closed-circuit television (CCTV) cameras in public spaces. In 1990, Mike Davis reviewed the design and operation of a shopping mall, with its centralised control room, CCTV cameras and security guards, and came to the conclusion that it "plagiarizes brazenly from Jeremy Bentham's renowned nineteenth-century design". In their 1996 study of CCTV camera installations in British cities, Nicholas Fyfe and Jon Bannister called central and local government policies that facilitated the rapid spread of CCTV surveillance a dispersal of an "electronic panopticon". Particular attention has been drawn to the similarities of CCTV with Bentham's prison design because CCTV technology enabled, in effect, a central observation tower, staffed by an unseen observer.

In 2026, UK Home Secretary Shabana Mahmood linked artificial intelligence-driven monitoring to the metaphor, stating her intent to "achieve, by means of AI and technology, what Jeremy Bentham tried to do with his panopticon". She further noted that this technology allows for a system where "the eyes of the state can be on you at all times". In the same year, satire talk show Last Week Tonight with John Oliver released a Police Surveillance Technology episode, where Oliver characterized the technology as a panopticon.

=== Employment and management ===
Shoshana Zuboff used the metaphor of the panopticon in her 1988 book In the Age of the Smart Machine: The Future of Work and Power to describe how computer technology makes work more visible. Zuboff examined how computer systems were used for employee monitoring to track the behavior and output of workers. She used the term 'panopticon' because the workers could not tell that they were being spied on, while the manager was able to check their work continuously. Zuboff argued that there is a collective responsibility formed by the hierarchy in the information panopticon that eliminates subjective opinions and judgements of managers on their employees. Because each employee's contribution to the production process is translated into objective data, it becomes more important for managers to be able to analyze the work rather than analyze the people.

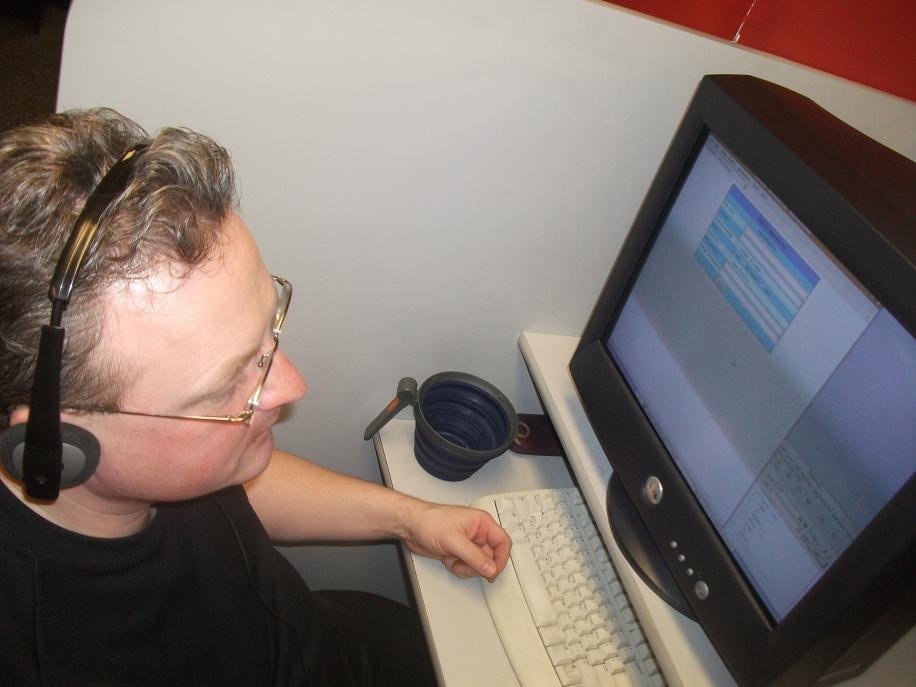
A call centre worker at his workstation

Foucault's use of the panopticon metaphor shaped the debate on workplace surveillance in the 1970s. In 1981 the sociologist Anthony Giddens expressed scepticism about the ongoing surveillance debate, criticising that "Foucault's 'archaeology', in which human beings do not make their own history but are swept along by it, does not adequately acknowledge that those subject to the power ... are knowledgeable agents, who resist, blunt or actively alter the conditions of life." The social alienation of workers and management in the industrialised production process had long been studied and theorised. In the 1950s and 1960s, the emerging behavioural science approach led to skills testing and recruitment processes that sought out employees that would be organisationally committed. Fordism, Taylorism and bureaucratic management of factories was still assumed to reflect a mature industrial society. The Hawthorne Plant experiments (1924–1933) and a significant number of subsequent empirical studies led to the reinterpretation of alienation: instead of being a given power relationship between the worker and management, it came to be seen as hindering progress and modernity. The increasing employment in the service industries has also been re-evaluated. In Entrapped by the electronic panopticon? Worker resistance in the call centre (2000), Phil Taylor and Peter Bain argue that the large number of people employed in call centres undertake predictable and monotonous work that is badly paid and offers few prospects. As such, they argue, it is comparable to factory work.

The panopticon has become a symbol of the extreme measures that some companies take in the name of efficiency as well as to guard against employee theft. Time-theft by workers has become accepted as an output restriction and theft has been associated by management with all behaviour that include avoidance of work. In the past decades "unproductive behaviour" has been cited as rationale for introducing a range of surveillance techniques and the vilification of employees who resist them. In a 2009 paper by Max Haiven and Scott Stoneman entitled Wal-Mart: The Panopticon of Time and the 2014 book by Simon Head Mindless: Why Smarter Machines Are Making Dumber Humans, which describes conditions at an Amazon depot in Augsburg, it is argued that catering at all times to the desires of the customer can lead to increasingly oppressive corporate environments and quotas in which many warehouse workers can no longer keep up with demands of management.

=== Social media ===
The concept of panopticon has been referenced in early discussions about the impact of social media. The notion of dataveillance was coined by Roger Clarke in 1987, since then academic researchers have used expressions such as superpanopticon (Mark Poster 1990), panoptic sort (Oscar H. Gandy Jr. 1993) and electronic panopticon (David Lyon 1994) to describe social media. Because the controlled is at the centre and surrounded by those who watch, early surveillance studies treat social media as a reverse panopticon.

In modern academic literature on social media, terms like lateral surveillance, social searching, and social surveillance are employed to critically evaluate the effects of social media. However, the sociologist Christian Fuchs treats social media like a classical panopticon. He argues that the focus should not be on the relationship between the users of a medium, but the relationship between the users and the medium. Therefore, he argues that the relationship between the large number of users and the sociotechnical Web 2.0 platform, like Facebook, amounts to a panopticon. Fuchs draws attention to the fact that use of such platforms requires identification, classification and assessment of users by the platforms and therefore, he argues, the definition of privacy must be reassessed to incorporate stronger consumer protection and protection of citizens from corporate surveillance.

== In popular culture ==
Foucault's theories positioned Bentham's panopticon prison in the social structures of 1970s Europe. This led to the widespread use of the panopticon in literature, comic books, computer games, and TV series.

=== Literature ===
The panopticon's principles is the central idea in the plot of We (Russian: Мы, romanized: My), a dystopian novel by Russian writer Yevgeny Zamyatin, written 1920–1921. Zamyatin applies the panopticon's principles to an entire society, where people live in buildings with fully transparent walls.

In the 1981 novella Chronicle of a Death Foretold by Gabriel García Márquez on the murder of Santiago Nasar, chapter four is written with a view on the characters through the panopticon of Riohacha.

Angela Carter, in her 1984 novel Nights at the Circus, linked the panopticon of Countes P to a "perverse honeycomb" and made the character the matriarchal queen bee.

=== Film and television ===
The 1948 American film Call Northside 777 features a scene filmed on location at the Stateville Penitentiary near Chicago, inside the so-called "Roundhouse," a panopticon cell block built according to Bentham's original concept, with the important difference that the central guard tower had transparent windows, making the positions and activities of the men inside it visible to all the prisoners.

In the 2011 TV series Person of Interest, Foucault's panopticon is used to grasp the pressure under which the character Harold Finch suffers in the post-9/11 United States of America.

In the 2014 film Guardians of the Galaxy, the Kyln high security prison incorporates panopticon features.

In Doctor Who, the hall where Time Lords conduct their most important ceremonies is called The Panopticon.

In the 2022 season of Andor, Cassian Andor is arrested and sent to the Narkina 5 prison, which is a panopticon.

=== Video games ===
In the 2019 video game Control, one of the major locations in the containment sector is named 'Panopticon,' and has architectural features that align with the use of the word.

In the 2023 video game Reverse: 1999, the ninth chapter of the game, "Folie et Déraison," takes place entirely in a panopticon, wherein the main character of this chapter breaks into the prison as to find her penpal, an inhabitant of the prison.

In the 2020 video game Ultrakill, a living panopticon made out of flesh is featured as a boss battle in the second Prime Sanctum.

In the video game Overwatch, Domina, a tank hero added in February 2026, has an ultimate ability called "Panopticon" which creates a spherical barrier around her enemies. The trapped enemy can be damaged but cannot damage back (the barrier must be broken first), most healing abilities from allies are also blocked. If not broken, the barrier explodes after a few seconds.

The Facility in the 2010 anime Yu-Gi-Oh! 5D's and Eisenwald Prison in the 2014 video game Wolfenstein: The New Order were designed as Panopticons.

In the 2026 video game Marathon, Panopticon is a prominent location present at the center of the Cryo Archive map.

A named location in the 2004 video game Grand Theft Auto: San Andreas near the center of the game world is "The Panopticon."

=== Other media ===
The horror fiction podcast The Magnus Archives features a modified version of the Millbank Prison panopticon as a major plot element.

== See also ==
- Atrium (architecture)
- Architecture
- Consumerism
- Dispositif
- Heterotopia (space)
- Landscapes of power
- Mass surveillance
- Panoptykon Foundation
- PRISM (surveillance program)
- Right to privacy
- Social facilitation
- Sousveillance
- Urban planning
- Total institution
- Torture
