= Banopticon =

The Banopticon (sometimes written as Ban-opticon) is a term coined by Paris School academic Didier Bigo used within an International Political Sociology approach to security studies to describe a situation where profiling technologies are used to determine whom to place under surveillance. The term, which is a portmanteau word consisting of ban and panopticon, takes its name from Michel Foucault's interpretation of the panopticon as used in Discipline and Punish and the notion of ban from international relations to describe a situation where observation is used as a disciplinary tool, namely by creating profiles for people and using databases to determine whether or not a person should be granted the right to move freely. According to Bigo, the banopticon is said to have contributed towards the securitization of migration in Europe.

== See also ==
- International Political Sociology
