= Koepelgevangenis (Haarlem) =

Former prison in Haarlem, Netherlands

Coordinates: 52.3836°N 4.6461°E

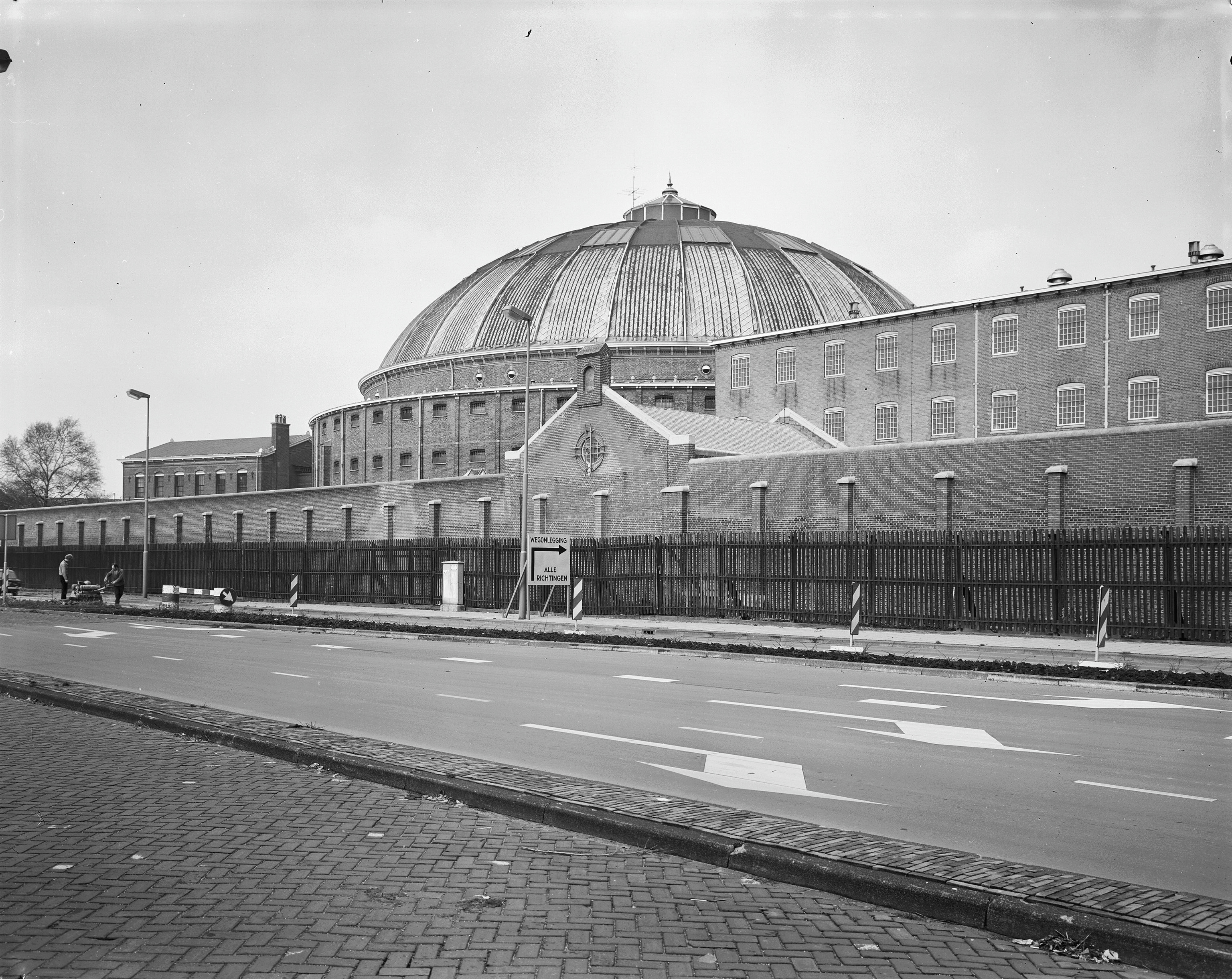
The Koepelgevangenis in 1974

The Koepelgevangenis is a former prison in Haarlem, Netherlands. It is one of three Panopticon-style buildings situated in the country. One of three designed by Willem Metzelaar, the building was completed in 1901. A Rijksmonument, the prison closed in 2016. After the prison's closure, the building, along with the one at Arnhem, was used to house asylum seekers to the Netherlands. The building has now been redeveloped for multifunctional use, it includes co-working and education spaces, a cinema and a hotel.

== See also ==
- Koepelgevangenis (Breda)
- Koepelgevangenis (Arnhem)
