= Koepelgevangenis (Breda) =

Dutch panopticon prison built in 1886

Coordinates: 51°35′25″N 4°47′14″E

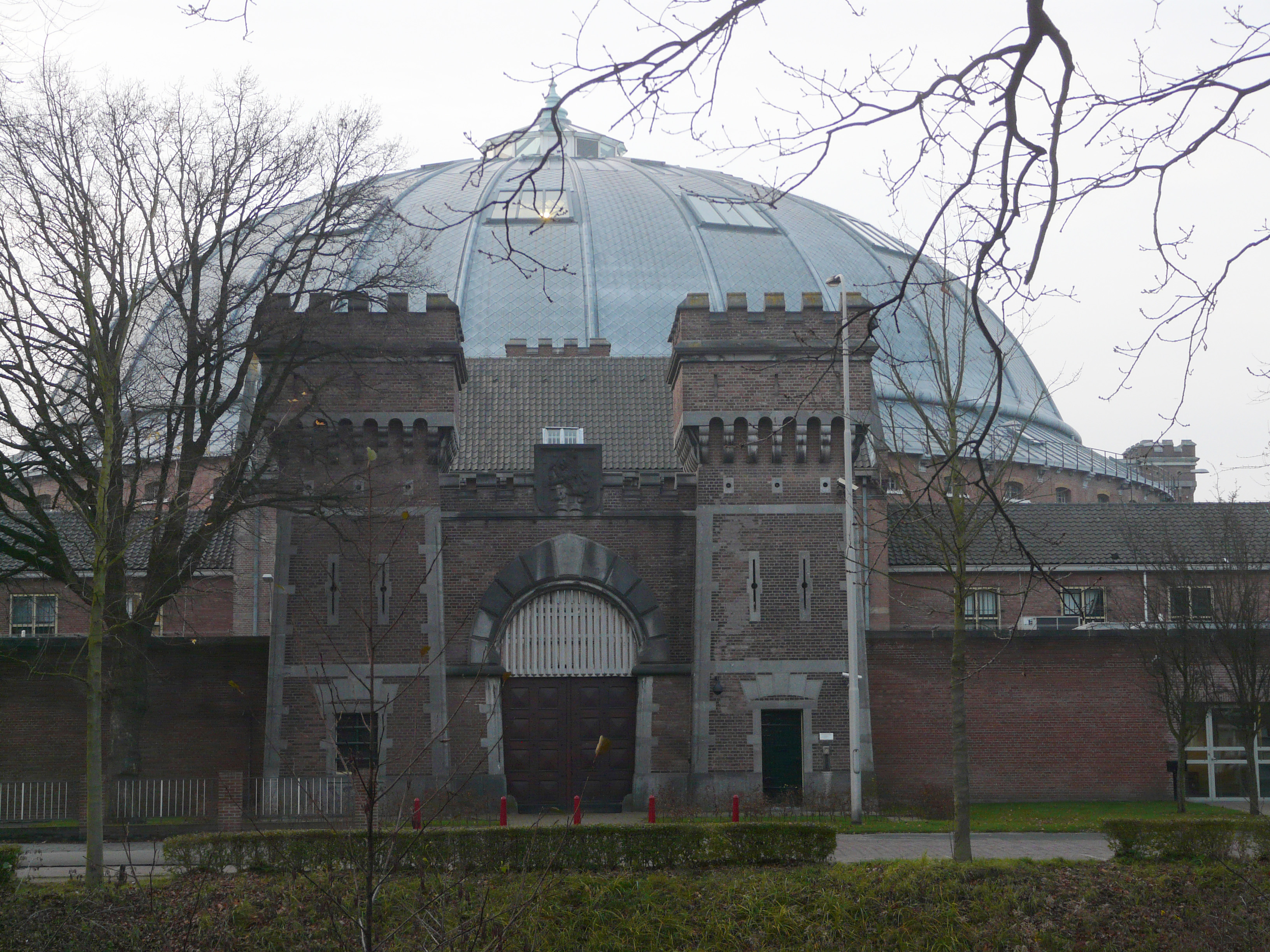
The Koepelgevangenis in 2008

The Koepelgevangenis is a former prison in Breda, Netherlands, constructed in 1886, best known as the prison where convicted World War II collaborators and Nazi war criminals were housed (including The Breda Four).

== History ==
The Koepelgevangenis was built from 1882 to 1886 (139 years ago), having been designed by Johan Frederik Metzelaar, who also designed a similar prison at Arnhem. The prison was constructed as a panopticon, as invented in 1791 by Jeremy Bentham. This allowed the guards to continuously watch the prisoners from the centre of the building.

The Koepelgevangenis complex was designated a national monument in 2001 and housed a women's prison until 2013. The women were transferred to the Ter Peel institution in Horst aan de Maas. In that year, it was announced that the entire prison would be closed due to budget cutbacks. The first department was closed in 2014, and the entire complex closed its doors at the start of 2016. As of 2018, the building is now used for events.

Since March 11, 2022, the location has been adjusted to become a semi-permanent living space for approximately 370 refugees, following the Russian invasion of Ukraine.

== Layout ==
The complex consists of:

- Fortified gate
- Separate church building
- A jail and the former Breda court building, designed by Willem Cornelis Metzelaar, son of Koepelgevangenis designer Johan Frederik Metzelaar.
- The Koepelgevangenis itself
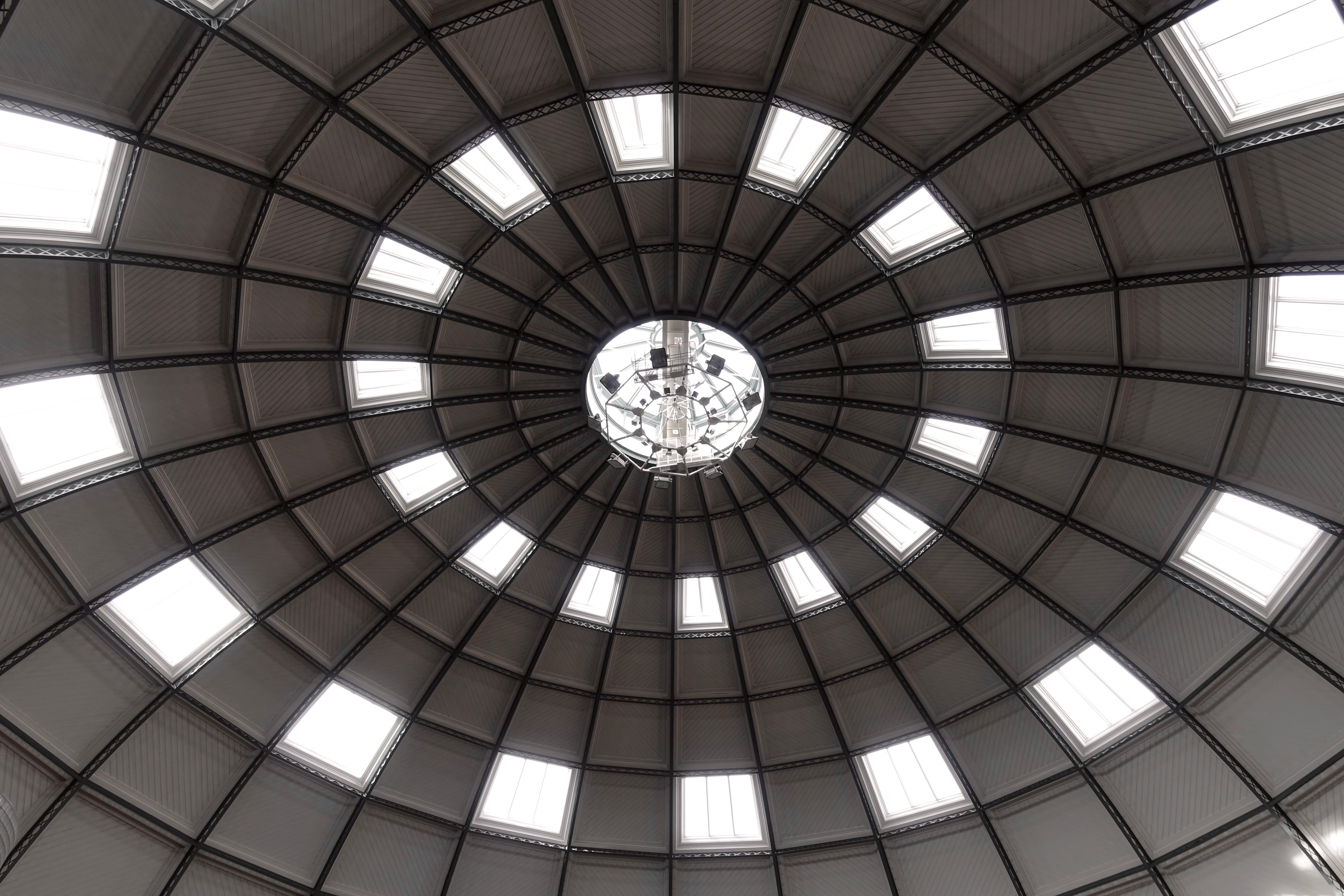
Ceiling of the dome from inside

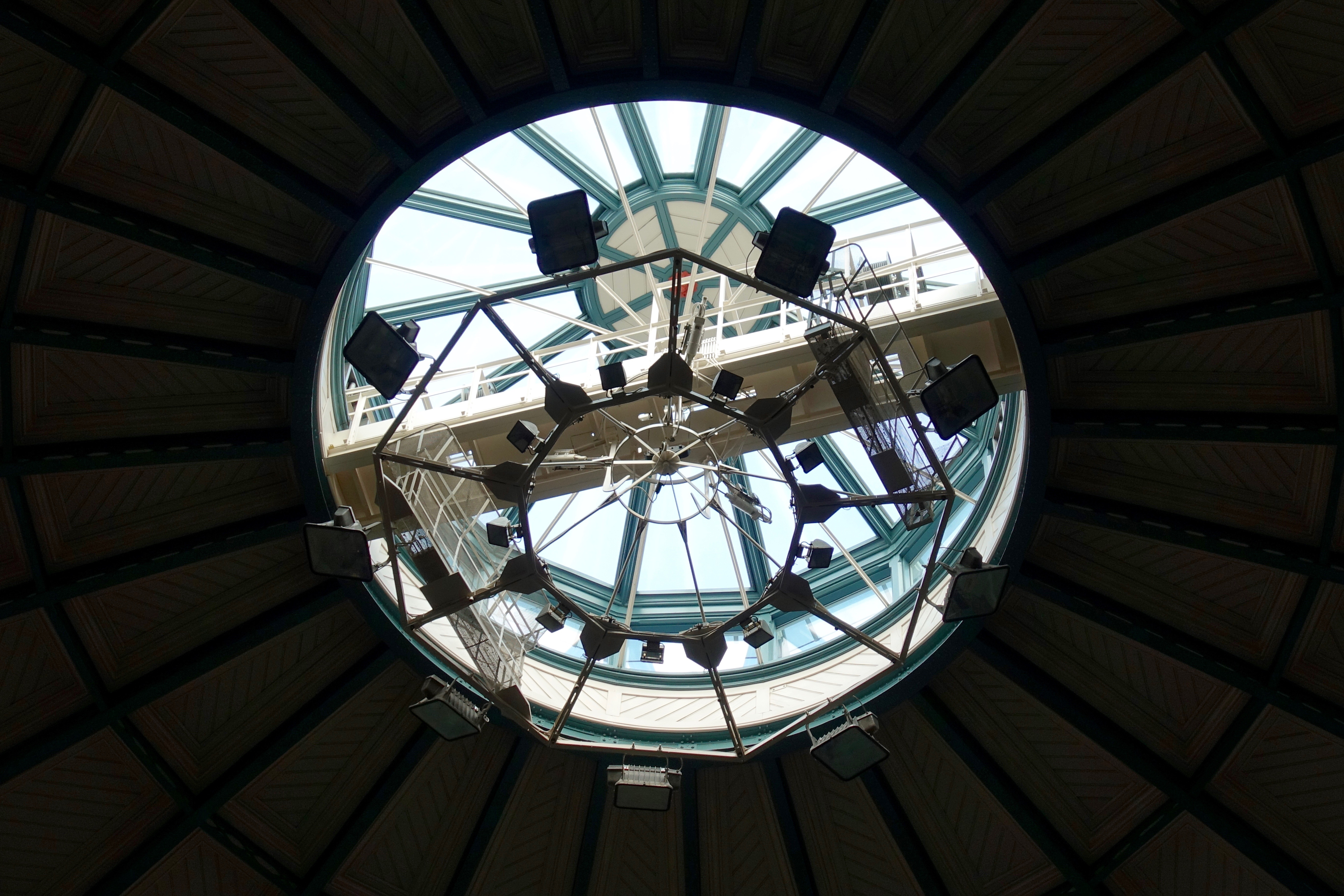
Closer view on the watchman area

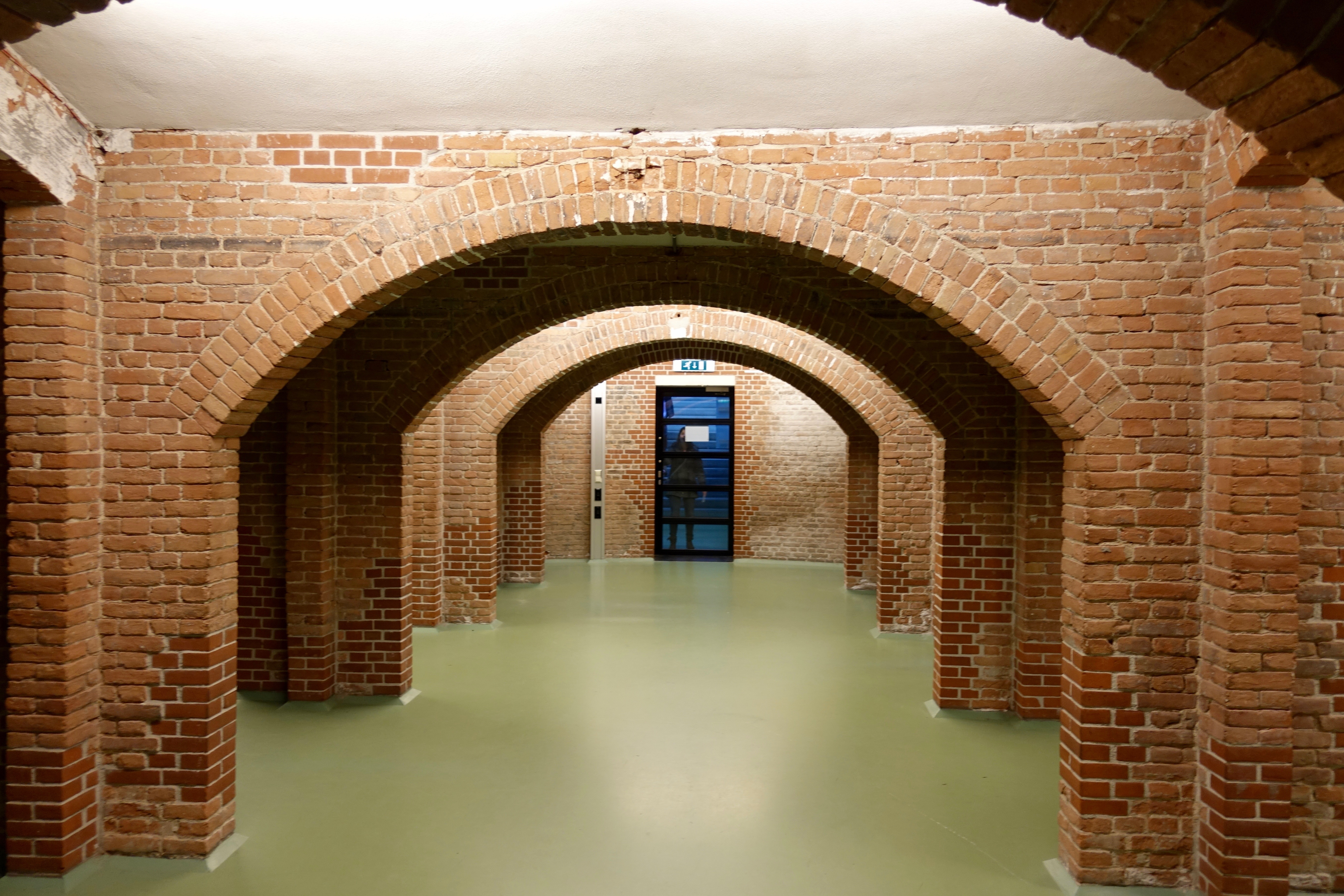
Basement area

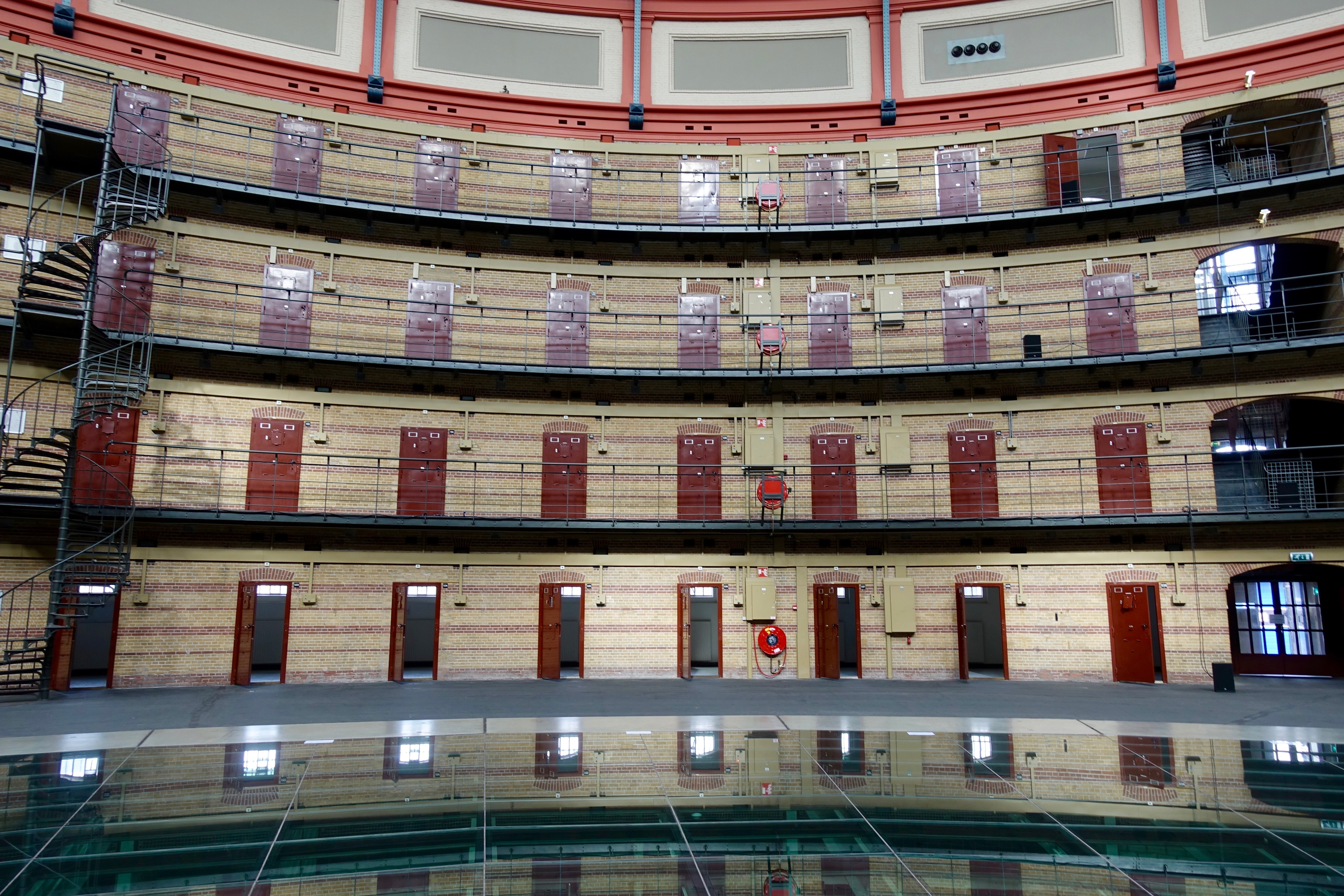
View from inside

== See also ==
- Koepelgevangenis (Arnhem), also designed by Johan Frederik Metzelaar
- Koepelgevangenis (Haarlem), designed by Willem Cornelis Metzelaar
