= Shoreditch TV =

Local community television station for residents of Shoreditch

Shoreditch TV is a local community television station broadcasting to residents of Shoreditch, London, UK.

An experimental 'Crime' channel broadcasts live CCTV from the streets of Shoreditch. Residents can compare those on the streets to a 'gallery of rogues' and report to Police anyone breaching an ASBO or acting suspiciously. This concept has been criticised by civil rights campaigners, who have dubbed it ASBO TV. Matt Foot from ASBO Concern said 'Here, you will have a situation of people spying on each other, which raises concerns about vigilantism and vulnerable people such as children being bullied on CCTV'. The channel is currently available to 22,000 viewers.

== See also ==
- Mass surveillance in the United Kingdom
