= Koepelgevangenis (Arnhem) =

Former prison in Arnhem, Netherlands

Coordinates: 51.9853°N 5.8783°E

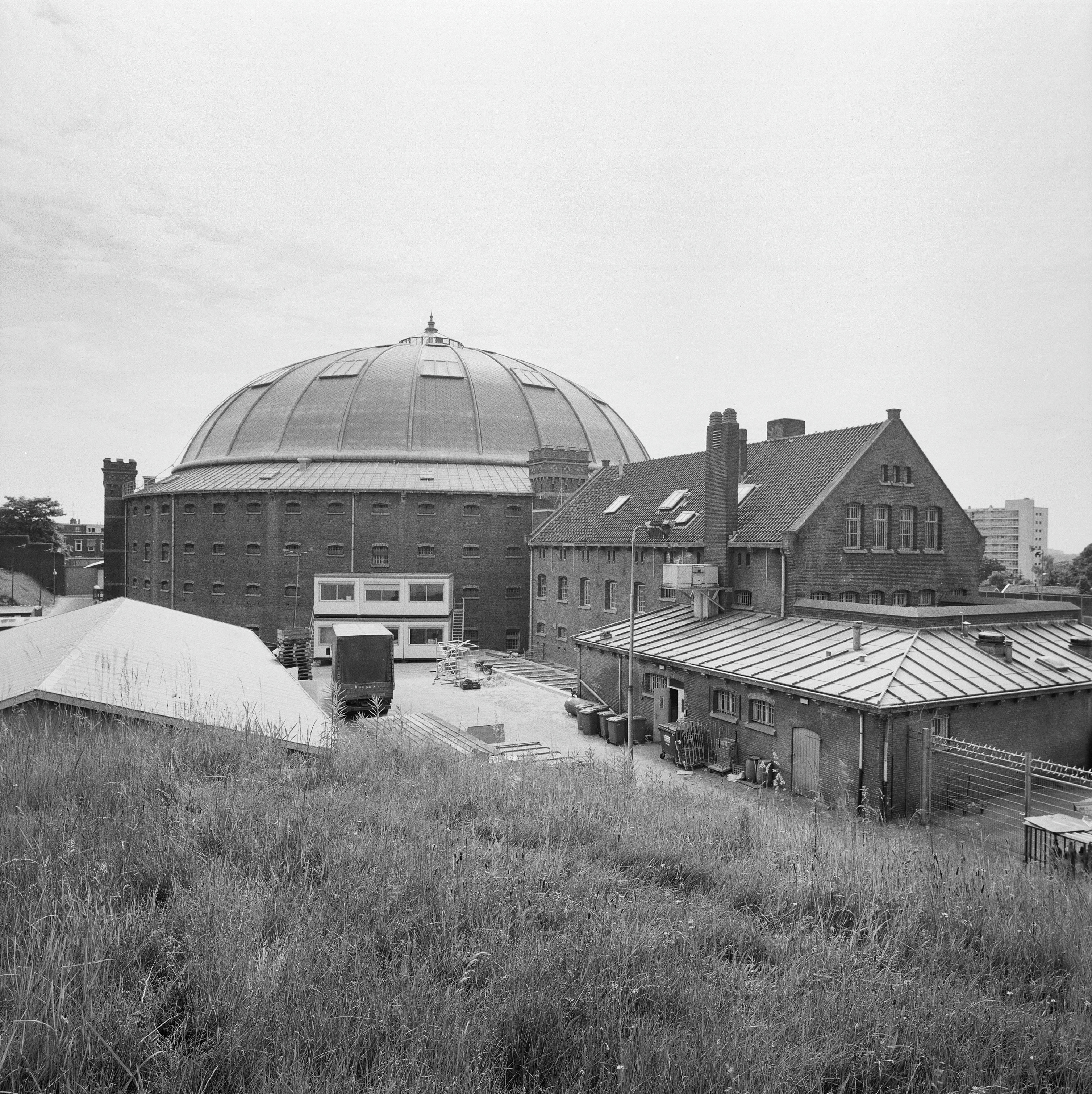
- The Koepelgevangenis in 1999
- Interactive map of Koepelgevangenis
- Location: Arnhem, Netherlands
- Status: Closed
- Opened: 1886
- Closed: 2016

The Koepelgevangenis is a former prison in Arnhem, Netherlands. It is one of three Panopticon-style buildings situated in the country. Designed by Johan Metzelaar, the building was completed in 1886. A Rijksmonument, the prison closed in 2016. After the prison's closure, the building, along with the one at Haarlem, was used to house asylum seekers to the Netherlands.

== See also ==
- Koepelgevangenis (Breda)
- Koepelgevangenis (Haarlem)
