= Cnemaspis argus =

Conservation status
- Least Concern (IUCN 3.1)

Scientific classification
- Kingdom: Animalia
- Phylum: Chordata
- Class: Reptilia
- Order: Squamata
- Suborder: Gekkota
- Family: Gekkonidae
- Genus: Cnemaspis
- Species: C. argus

Binomial name
- Cnemaspis argus Dring, 1979
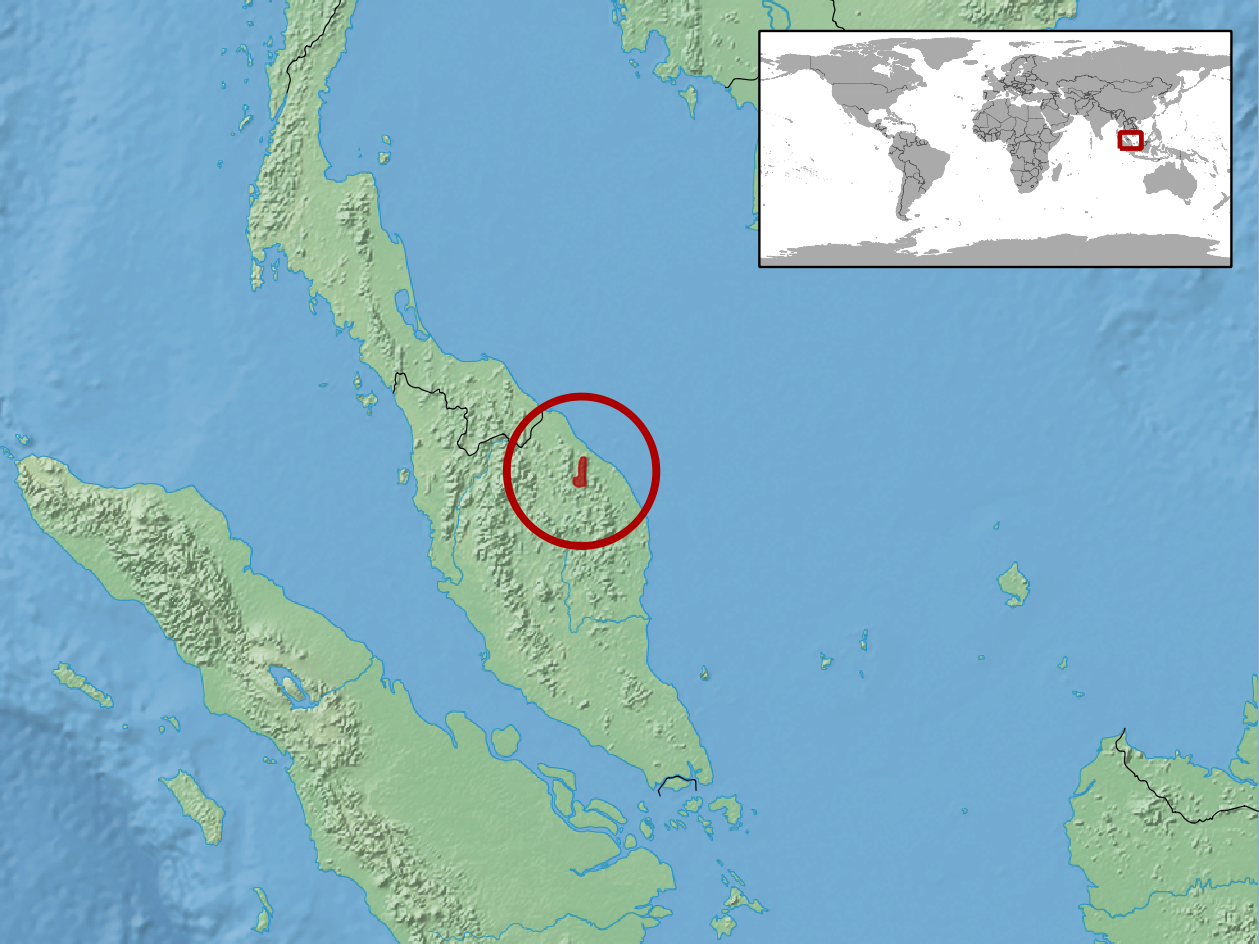

Species of lizard

Cnemaspis argus, also known commonly as the Argus gecko, the Argus rock gecko, Dring's gecko, and the Lawit Mountain rock gecko, is a species of lizard in the family Gekkonidae. The species is endemic to Peninsular Malaysia.

== Etymology ==
The specific name, argus, refers to Argus, the many-eyed giant in Greek mythology, an allusion to the ocelli (eye-spots) of this species.

== Geographic range ==
C. argus is found in northern Terengganu state, Peninsular Malaysia.

== Habitat ==
The preferred natural habitat of C. argus is forest with large granite rocks, at altitudes of 40–790 m (130–2,590 ft)

== Description ==
C. argus may attain a snout-to-vent length (SVL) of 6.5 cm (2.6 in).

== Behavior ==
C. argus is diurnal.

== Reproduction ==
C. argus is oviparous.
